= Reno (disambiguation) =

Reno is the fourth most populous city in the U.S. state of Nevada.

Reno may also refer to:

== Places ==
=== Australia ===
- Reno, New South Wales - rural locality and former mining village, immediately to the north-west of Gundagai

=== Canada ===
- Reno, Alberta, a hamlet
- Rural Municipality of Reno No. 51, Saskatchewan

=== Italy ===
- Reno (river), northern Italy
- Rhine River, Reno in the Italian language

=== United States ===
- Reno, Georgia, an unincorporated community
- Reno, Illinois, an unincorporated community
- Reno, Indiana, an unincorporated community
- Reno, Kansas, an unincorporated community
- Reno, Minnesota, an unincorporated community
- Reno, Ohio, a census-designated place
- Reno, Pennsylvania, in the Borough of Sugarcreek
- Reno, Lamar County, Texas, a city
- Reno, Parker County, Texas, a city
- Reno (Washington, D.C.), a former town and neighborhood in the District of Columbia
- Reno County, Kansas
- Reno Lake, a lake in Minnesota
- Reno Township (disambiguation)
- Roman Catholic Diocese of Reno
- Reno, Nevada
- Fort Reno (disambiguation)

== People ==
- Reno (surname)
- Reno (given name)
- Reno (wrestler), ring name of retired professional wrestler Rick Cornell

=== Fictional characters ===
- Reno, a member of the "Turks" in the videogame Final Fantasy VII

== Arts and entertainment ==
- Reno (1923 film), an American silent film
- Reno (1930 film), an American silent film
- Reno (1939 film), directed by John Farrow
- "Reno" (Doug Supernaw song), 1993
- "Reno" (Dottie West song), 1968
- "Reno" (Bruce Springsteen song), 2005 on his album Devils & Dust

== Sports ==
- Reno Air Races, airplane competition
- FC Reno, a Jamaican football team
- Reno Open, a golf tournament in 1990 and 1991

== Transportation ==
- Renault, a French automaker which is sometimes pronounced as "Reno"
- Suzuki Reno, a compact car
- Reno Air, a passenger airline based in Reno, Nevada, which operated from 1992 to 1999
- Reno station, a train station in Reno, Nevada
- Reno, a Virginia & Truckee Railroad steam locomotive built in 1872

== In the military ==
- USS Reno (DD-303), American destroyer sunk during World War I, named after Walter E. Reno
- USS Reno (CL-96), American cruiser, named after the city of Reno, Nevada

== Other uses ==
- A shortened version of the word renovation
- Reno, an alternative name for Italian wine made from the Riesling grape
- The TCP Reno congestion avoidance algorithm
- Reactor Experiment for Neutrino Oscillation (RENO)
- Reno, an OPPO phone brand
- Reno, a Filipino food product brand commonly associated with Liver spread
- Reno, a retailer in Germany.
- 4.3BSD-Reno

== See also ==
- El Reno (disambiguation)
- Reno Center, an apartment complex in Karachi, Pakistan
- Reino (disambiguation)
