= 2013 Oklahoma tornadoes =

2013 Oklahoma tornadoes may refer to:

- The tornado outbreak of May 18–21, 2013, including a tornado on May 20 that occurred in southern parts of the Oklahoma City metropolitan area
- The tornado outbreak of May 26–31, 2013, including a tornado that occurred on May 31 west of Oklahoma City in rural parts of El Reno
