= List of tornadoes by width =

This is a list of tornadoes by their official and unofficial width. The average width of a tornado according to the National Weather Service is 50 yards (46 m). The official widest tornado in history is the 2013 El Reno tornado, which had a confirmed width of 2.6 miles (4.2 km), with the World Meteorological Organization believing the width could have been up to 1 mile (1.6 km) wider.

== List ==
=== Width of at least 2 miles (3.2 km) ===
List of tornadoes with a width of at least 2 miles (3.2 km)
Tornado	F#/EF#/IF#	Width	Rated by
1999 Mulhall tornado	F4	4.3 miles (6.9 km)	NWS Norman, CSWR, Wurman, OU, Penn State
Officially, this tornado was just over 1 mile (1.6 km) wide. A Doppler on Wheels (DOW) mobile radar observed this tornado as it crossed Mulhall. The DOW documented the largest-ever-observed core flow circulation with a distance of 1,600 m (5,200 ft) between peak velocities on either side of the tornado, and a roughly 7 km (4.3 mi) width of peak wind gusts exceeding 43 m/s (96 mph), making the Mulhall tornado the largest tornado ever measured quantitatively.
1946 Timber Lake tornado	F1	4.0 miles (6.4 km)	USWB
The United States Weather Bureau published in 1946 stating the width of the tornado was 4 miles (6.4 km), which would make this the widest tornado ever officially documented in history. However, this is outside the period of reliable documentation accepted by the modern National Weather Service, which is 1950–present.
2013 El Reno tornado	EF3	2.6 miles (4.2 km)	NWS Norman, OU
This is officially the widest tornado to ever occur, with a width of 2.6 miles (4.2 km) at its peak. This is the width found by the National Weather Service based on preliminary data from University of Oklahoma RaXPol mobile radar that also sampled winds of 296 mph (476 km/h), which was used to upgrade the tornado to EF5. However, it was revealed that these winds did not impact any structures, and as a result the tornado was downgraded to EF3 based on damage. The tornado was the first tornado to kill storm chasers.
2016 Jiangsu tornado	EF4	2.55 miles (4.10 km)	CMA, OU, NJU, Weathernews Inc.
This tornado is the widest tornado to ever occur in China and officially is tied as the 2nd widest tornado in history and also holds the record as the widest tornado to ever occur in Asia.
1984 Maxton–Red Springs tornado	F4	2.5 miles (4.0 km)	NWS Wilmington, NC
The National Weather Service in Wilmington, North Carolina stated this tornado was 2.5 miles (4.0 km) at a point in time.
2004 Hallam tornado	F4	2.5 miles (4.0 km)	NWS Omaha/Valley
Prior to the 2013 El Reno tornado, this tornado held the official record as the widest tornado to ever occur, it still holds the record for the widest tornado in the state of Nebraska.
1896 Seneca–Oneida tornado	F5	2–2.5 miles (3.2–4.0 km)	NWS Wichita, KS
The tornado averaged 1 mi (1.6 km) mile in width, but expanded significantly to between 2 mi (3.2 km) and 2.5 mi (4.0 km) as it approached Reserve, Kansas, where all but three buildings were damaged or destroyed.
2020 Bassfield–Soso tornado	EF4	2.25 miles (3.62 km)	NWS Jackson, MS
This tornado was documented by the National Weather Service in Jackson, Mississippi to have been 2.25 miles (3.62 km) wide, setting the record as the widest tornado to occur in the state of Mississippi.
1935 Melbourne tornado	F0	2.239 miles (3.603 km)	BoM
The Australian Bureau of Meteorology (BoM) documented that this weak tornado was 3,603 metres (2.239 mi; 3.603 km) wide.
2007 Trousdale tornado	EF3	2.2 miles (3.5 km)	NWS Dodge City, KS
The high-end EF3 tornado had a recorded width of 2.2 miles (3.5 km).
2021 South Moravia tornado	IF4	2.2 miles (3.5 km)	ESSL, CHMI, CUNI, Meteopress, SHMU, CU, Geosphere, Austrocontrol, BUT
This tornado reached a maximum width of 2.2 miles (3.5 km), setting the record as the widest tornado to ever occur in the Czech Republic and in Europe.
2025 Rio Bonito do Iguaçu tornado	F4	2.02 miles (3.25 km)	PREVOTS, MetSul Meteorologia, SIMEPAR
This tornado reached its maximum width of 2.02 miles (3.25 km) within the city of Rio Bonito do Iguaçu before shrinking in width. Setting the record as the widest tornado ever registered in South America and Brazil.
1456 Italy Tornado	FU	2.0 miles (3.2 km)	Chatfield, Machiavelli
A tornado that grew up to 2 miles (3.2 km) wide started as a waterspout off the coast of Italy, came ashore near Ancona, and traveled across the entire country moving from east to west before retreating back into the ocean on the opposite side of the country near Pisa. Niccolò Machiavelli writes a very detailed description of this storm in his book Florentine Histories.
2008 Pardeeville tornado	EF2	2.0 miles (3.2 km)	NWS Milwaukee/Sullivan
This tornado was extremely wide since the thunderstorm cloud base was very low and the mesocyclone that is usually aloft was well-formed all the way to the ground. Within a broad 1 to 2 miles (1.6 to 3.2 km) wide area of EF0 to EF1 damage, there were several small swaths of EF2 damage due to multiple vortices.
1967 Belvidere tornado	F4	2.0 miles (3.2 km)	NWS Chicago
The widest significant tornado recorded in the Chicago collar counties. 24 deaths and 500 injuries.

=== Width of 1–2 miles (1.6–3.2 km) ===
List of tornadoes with a width of at least 1 mile (1.6 km)
Tornado	F#/EF#/IF#	Width	Rated by
1902 Javaugues tornado	F3/EF3	1.864 miles (3.000 km)	ESSL, Keraunos, TORRO
This tornado reached a maximum width of 3,280 yards (1.86 mi; 3.00 km), setting the record as the widest tornado ever occurred in France while moving along an unusual northwestward path.
2016 Lindale, Texas Tornado	EF2	1.83 miles (2.95 km)	NWS Shreveport
This long track, multiple-vortex reached an maximum width of 1.83 Miles according to NWS Shrevport
2024 Decatur, Arkansas tornado	EF3	1.82 miles (2.93 km)	NWS Tulsa
This slow-moving tornado reached a maximum width of 3,200 yards (1.8 mi; 2.9 km), it holds the record as the largest tornado to ever occur in Arkansas.
1947 Glazier–Higgins–Woodward tornado	F5	1.8 miles (2.9 km)	NWS Norman
Widest tornado in Texas and deadliest tornado in Oklahoma.
2025 St. Louis tornado	EF3	1.8 miles (2.9 km)	NWS St. Louis, MO
This tornado reached a maximum width of 3,168 yards (1.800 mi; 2.897 km).
2010 Yazoo City tornado	EF4	1.75 miles (2.82 km)	NWS
This tornado had a width of 3,080 yards (1.75 mi; 2.82 km), making it the largest tornado in Mississippi at the time (until a wider tornado almost ten years later broke the record).
2007 Greensburg tornado	EF5	1.7 miles (2.7 km)	NWS Dodge City
This tornado reached a maximum width of 3,000 yards (1.7 mi; 2.7 km).
2024 Rogers, Arkansas tornado	EF2	1.7 miles (2.7 km)	NWS Tulsa
This tornado reached a maximum width of 3,000 yards (1.7 mi; 2.7 km).
2025 Pittsburg-Blanco tornado	EF3	2,972 yards (1.689 mi; 2.718 km)	NWS Tulsa, OK
This tornado reached a maximum width of 2,972 yards (1.689 mi; 2.718 km) as it impacted the town of Blanco, OK.
2011 Vilonia tornado	EF2	1.65 miles (2.66 km)	NWS Little Rock
This tornado reached a maximum width of 2,900 yards (1.6 mi; 2.7 km).
1625 Toropets tornado	F4	1.553 miles (2.499 km)	ESSL
This long-tracked tornado reached a maximum width of 2,730 yards (1.55 mi; 2.50 km), setting the record as the widest tornado ever occurred in Russia.
2025 Taylakovo tornado	F3/IF2	1.553 miles (2.499 km)	GIS-PSNRU, ESSL
A long track, extremely wide wedge tornado tracked through rural parts of Khanty-Mansia. Reaching a peak width of 2.5 kilometres (1.6 mi), it is tied with the 1625 Toropets tornado for the widest in Russia.
1967 Pommereuil tornado	F4/EF4	1.553 miles (2.499 km)	ESSL, Keraunos
This tornado reached a maximum width of 2,730 yards (1.55 mi; 2.50 km).
2020 Brooks Lake tornado	EF2	2.44 kilometres (1.52 mi)	Northern Tornadoes Project
A large tornado destroyed a structure and thousands of trees in the wilderness north of Nestor Falls in the Kenora District of Northwestern Ontario, Canada. This was the widest tornado officially recorded in Canada.
1965 São Clemente tornado	FU	1.2 miles (1.9 km)	Robert C. Dyer
Part of a large tornado outbreak with at least 24 tornadoes documented. This tornado was the widest tornado from the outbreak, with a peak width of 1.9 kilometres (1.2 mi).
1990 Stratton tornado	F4	1.5 miles (2.4 km)	NWS
This tornado reached its peak width of 1.5 miles (2.4 km; 2,600 yd).
2011 Tuscaloosa–Birmingham tornado	EF4	1.48 miles (2.38 km)	NWS Birmingham
This tornado reached a maximum width of 2,600 yards (1.5 mi; 2.4 km) and was the costliest tornado ever before the Joplin tornado.
2021 Western Kentucky tornado	EF4	1.48 miles (2.38 km)	NWS Paducah, Marshall, NWS Omaha
This long-tracked tornado reached a maximum width of 2,600 yards (1.5 mi; 2.4 km).
1987 Teton–Yellowstone tornado	F4	1.44 miles (2.32 km)	NWS, Forest Service
This tornado had a maximum width of 2,550 yards (1.45 mi; 2.33 km).
2017 Natchitoches tornado	EF1	1.4 miles (2.3 km)	NWS Shreveport
A large but weak wedge tornado reached a peak width of 1.4 miles (2.3 km), making it the largest tornado in Louisiana and the largest EF1 tornado to ever occur.
2013 Wayne tornado	EF4	1.38 miles (2.22 km)	NWS
A large and violent tornado hit Nebraska, reaching a maximum width of 2,429 yards (2.221 km).
2025 Dryfork tornado	EF1	2,300 yards (1.3 mi; 2.1 km)	NWS Tulsa, OK
This tornado reached a maximum width of 2,300 yards (1.3 mi; 2.1 km).
2010 Bolotovo tornado	F3	1.3 miles (2.1 km)	ESSL
This tornado reached a maximum width of 2,300 yards (1.3 mi; 2.1 km).
2025 Stilwell tornado	EF1	2,200 yards (1.3 mi; 2.0 km)	NWS Tulsa, OK
This tornado reached a maximum width of 2,200 yards (1.3 mi; 2.0 km).
2011 Hackleburg–Phil Campbell tornado	EF5	1.25 miles (2.01 km)	NWS Huntsville
This tornado reached a maximum width of 2,200 yards (1.3 mi; 2.0 km) while at peak EF5 intensity.
2025 Bingham–Ashby tornado	EF2	1.25 miles (2.01 km)	NWS North Platte
This tornado reached a maximum width of 2,200 yards (1.3 mi; 2.0 km).
1795 Vidzeme region tornado	FU	1.24 miles (2.00 km)	ESSL
The widest Latvian tornado with a maximum width of 2,187 yards (1.243 mi; 2.000 km).
1836 Polack tornado	F3	1.24 miles (2.00 km)	ESSL
The widest Belarussian tornado with a maximum width of 2,187 yards (1.243 mi; 2.000 km).
1862 Żerków tornado	F4	1.24 miles (2.00 km)	ESSL
This tornado reached a maximum width of 2,187 yards (1.243 mi; 2.000 km).
1924 Pilisvörösvár tornado	F4	1.24 miles (2.00 km)	ESSL
The widest tornado in Hungary with a maximum width of 2,187 yards (1.243 mi; 2.000 km). Suspected to be an F5.
2003 Jemielnica tornado	F3	1.24 miles (2.00 km)	ESSL
This tornado reached a maximum width of 2,187 yards (1.243 mi; 2.000 km) and tied with Żerków tornado as the widest tornado ever occurred in Poland.
2008 Lakhoma tornado	F2	1.24 miles (2.00 km)	ESSL
This northwestward-moving tornado reached a maximum width of 2,187 yards (1.243 mi; 2.000 km).
2008 Parkersburg–New Hartford tornado	EF5	1.2 miles (1.9 km)	NWS
This tornado reached a maximum width of 2,112 yards (1.200 mi; 1.931 km).
2007 Hopewell tornado	EF3	1.199 miles (1.930 km)	NWS Dodge City
The high-end EF3 tornado had a recorded width of 2,110 yards (1.20 mi; 1.93 km).
2026 Little Springs tornado	EF3	2,050 yards (1.16 mi)	NWS Jackson, MS
This low-end EF3 had a peak width of 2,050 yards (1.16 mi). 23 people sustained injuries during this strong tornado.
2023 Covington tornado	EF3	2,000 yards (1.136 mi; 1.829 km)	NWS Memphis
This tornado, which had initially been surveyed by Tipton County emergency management as being 3.5 mi (5.6 km) wide, was determined by a survey to have still reached a width of 2,000 yd (1.136 mi; 1.829 km).
2025 Imogene-Essex tornado	EF1	1,971.2 yards (1.1200 mi; 1.8025 km)	NWS Omaha
This tornado reached a maximum width of 1,971.2 yards (1.1200 mi; 1.8025 km). Its width was initially put at 3,130 yards (1.78 mi; 2.86 km), which would have made it the largest tornado in Iowa and the largest ever EF1 tornado, but this number was later revised.
2013 Moore tornado	EF5	1.1 miles (1.8 km)	NWS Norman, OU, Marshall
This tornado reached a maximum width of 1,900 yards (1.1 mi; 1.7 km).
2023 Jonesboro tornado	EF2	1.095 miles (1.762 km)	NWS Shreveport
This tornado reached a maximum width of 1,928 yards (1.095 mi; 1.763 km).
2023 Sede Nova tornado	F3	1.080 miles (1.738 km)	PREVOTS
This tornado is a part of a tornado outbreak in Brazil, travelling for 64 km (39 mi) and being one of the widest tornado ever documented in South America, rated as high-end F3.
1984 Bolshoe Sartovo tornado	F3	1.080 miles (1.738 km)	ESSL, Chernokulsky, Shikhov
This tornado reached a maximum width of 1,903 yards (1.081 mi; 1.740 km).
Tornado de Guaraciaba de 2009	F4	1.05 miles (1.69 km)	Instituto Nacional de Meteorologia
This tornado reached a maximum width of 1,850 yards (1.05 mi; 1.69 km).
2025 Enderlin tornado	EF5	1.05 miles (1.69 km)	NWS Grand Forks
This tornado reached a maximum width of 1,850 yards (1.05 mi; 1.69 km).
2026 Appleton-Menasha Tornado	EF3	1.022 miles (1.645 km)	NWS Green Bay
This tornado reached a maximum width of 1,800 yards (1.0 mi; 1.6 km).
1888 Bermuda Waterspout	FU	1.0 mile (1.6 km)	Chatfield
The steamship Avon reported a waterspout off the coast of Bermuda that was at least 1 mile (1.6 km) wide.
2007 Svetlogorsk tornado	1.0 mile (1.6 km)	ESSL	
This tornado reached a maximum width of 1,760 yards (1.00 mi; 1.61 km).
2008 Windsor tornado	EF3	1.0 mile (1.6 km)	NWS Denver
This tornado reached a maximum width of 1,760 yards (1.00 mi; 1.61 km) and holds the record as the widest tornado to occur in the state of Colorado.
2011 Joplin tornado	EF5	1.0 mile (1.6 km)	NWS Springfield
This tornado reached a maximum width of 1,760 yards (1.00 mi; 1.61 km) and holds the record as the costliest tornado ever.
2011 El Reno–Piedmont tornado	EF5	1.0 mile (1.6 km)	NWS Norman
This tornado reached a maximum width of 1,760 yards (1.00 mi; 1.61 km).
2012 Bol'nitsa tornado	F3	1.0 mile (1.6 km)	ESSL
This tornado reached a maximum width of 1,760 yards (1.00 mi; 1.61 km).
2013 Krutoy Log tornado	F3	1.0 mile (1.6 km)	ESSL
This tornado reached a maximum width of 1,760 yards (1.00 mi; 1.61 km).
2024 Custer City tornado	EF2	1.0 mile (1.6 km)	NWS Norman
This multi-vortex EF2 tornado, which prompted a tornado emergency for Custer County, Oklahoma, was accompanied by significant rear flank downdraft winds exceeding 100 mph (160 km/h), with the total path width being 2.7 miles (4.3 km) wide. A Ka-POL doppler radar, operated by Texas Tech University, recorded a wind speed of 87.9 m/s (197 mph; 316 km/h) while verifying the tornado's actual width.
2024 Spaulding–Holdenville tornado	EF3	1.0 mile (1.6 km)	NWS Norman
This tornado reached a maximum width of 1,760 yards (1.00 mi; 1.61 km).
2025 Plevna tornado	EF3	1,760 yards (1.00 mi; 1.61 km)	NWS Wichita, KS
This EF3 tornado, produced by a powerful and cyclic supercell, reached a maximum width of 1,760 yards (1.00 mi; 1.61 km) as it approached the town of Plevna, KS, prompting the issuance of a tornado emergency.
1976 Lemont tornado	F4	1,760 yards (1.00 mi)	NWS Chicago, IL
This tornado had a width of a mile wide,
1992 Fritch tornado	F4	1.0 mile (1.6 km)	NWS Amarillo, TX
This F4 grew to a mile wide damaging or destroying 1360 structures while injuring 7.
1953 Sarnia tornado	F4	1.0 mile (1.6 km)	NWS, TWN
This tornado reached a maximum width of 1,760 yards (1.00 mi; 1.61 km), it held the record as the largest tornado in Canada until 2020.

== See also ==
- Weather records
- List of tropical cyclone extremes
- Tornado myths
- List of F5, EF5, and IF5 tornadoes
- List of F4, EF4, and IF4 tornadoes
- List of tornadoes and tornado outbreaks
  - List of tornado outbreaks by outbreak intensity score
- List of schools struck by tornadoes
- List of tornadoes with confirmed satellite tornadoes
