= El Reno (disambiguation) =

El Reno is the county seat of Canadian County in the U.S. state of Oklahoma.

El Reno may also refer to:

- El Reno High School
- El Reno Hotel
- El Reno Regional Airport, near the city
- Lake El Reno, a reservoir near the city
- El Reno Group, a geologic group in Oklahoma

== See also ==
- Reno (disambiguation)
- El Reno tornado
