= Reno (surname) =

Reno is the surname of:

- Don Reno (1927–1984), American country musician
- Ginette Reno (born 1946), French-Canadian author
- Ittie Kinney Reno (1862–1941), American novelist and social leader
- Jack Reno (1935–2008), American country singer
- Janet Reno (1938–2016), attorney general of the United States
- Jean Reno (born 1948), French actor
- Jesse L. Reno (1823–1862), American military general during the Mexican–American and American Civil Wars
- Jesse W. Reno (1861–1947), American inventor of the escalator
- Jim Reno (1929–2008), American bronze sculptor
- Jimmy Reno (born 1969), American Christian country music singer
- Marcus Reno (1834–1889), American cavalry officer who was present at the Battle of Little Big Horn
- Mary Hall Reno, American physicist
- Max E. Reno (1926–2004), American politician
- Michael Reno (born 1952), American composer and musician
- Mike Reno (born 1955), Canadian rock musician
- Milo Reno (1866–1936), American farmer
- Nancy Reno (born 1965), American beach volleyball player
- Noelle Reno (born 1983), American marketing leader, public speaker, and influencer
- R. R. Reno (born 1959), American magazine editor, writer, and theologian
- Stephen Reno, American academic administrator
- Sue Reno, American fiber artist
- Tosca Reno (born 1959), Canadian author and nutritionist
- Vincent Reno (1911–1990), American mathematician and spy for the Soviets
- Walter E. Reno (1881–1917), American naval officer
- William H. Reno (born 1936), American Army general
- Franklin (Frank), John, Simeon (Sim) and William (Bill) Reno, members of the Reno Gang (died 1868), an American Civil War criminal gang
- Reno (comedian), American stand-up comedian, born Karen Reno in 1956
