= Fort Reno =

Fort Reno may refer to any of the three United States Army posts named for General Jesse L. Reno:

- Fort Reno Park, in Washington, D.C., established 1862 (originally Fort Pennsylvania)
- Fort Reno (Oklahoma), in present-day Oklahoma, established during the Indian Wars, July 1874
- Fort Reno (Wyoming), in present-day Wyoming on the Bozeman Trail, established August 1865

== See also ==
- Reno (disambiguation)
