= El Reno tornado =

El Reno tornado may refer to:

- The 2011 El Reno–Piedmont tornado, a long-track EF5 tornado that passed near El Reno and other communities west and north of Oklahoma City
- The 2013 El Reno tornado, the widest tornado on record, which passed south and east of El Reno, Oklahoma
- The 2019 El Reno tornado, a brief EF3 tornado which struck southern parts of El Reno
