= Multiple-vortex tornado =

Tornado comprising multiple vortices

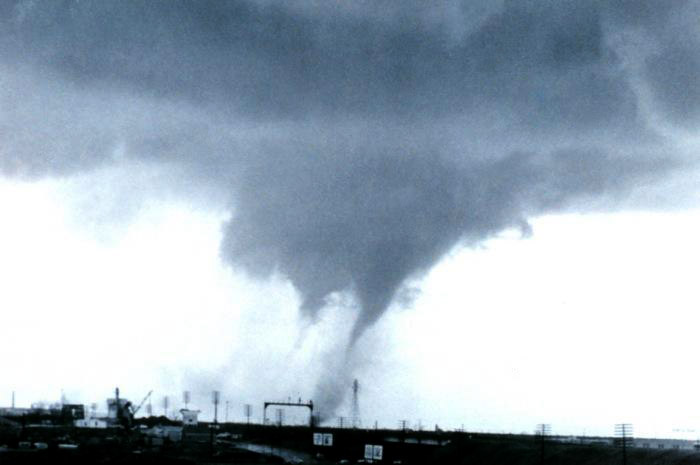
- A multiple-vortex tornado outside Dallas, Texas, on April 2, 1957
- Area of occurrence: Every continent except Antarctica
- Season: Any, though primarily in spring or summer
- Effect: Wind damage

A multiple-vortex tornado (often shortened to multi-vortex tornado) is a tornado that contains several vortices (called subvortices or suction vortices) revolving around, inside of, and as part of the main vortex. The only times multiple vortices may be visible are when the tornado is first forming or when condensation and debris are balanced such that subvortices are apparent without being obscured. They can add over 100 mph to the ground-relative wind in a tornado circulation and are responsible for most cases where narrow arcs of extreme destruction lie right next to weak damage within tornado paths.

== Description ==
Suction vortices, also known as suction spots, are substructures found in many tornadoes, though they are not always easily visible. These vortices typically occur at the base of the tornado, where it makes contact with the ground. Sub-vortices tend to form after vortex breakdown reaches the surface, resulting from the interaction of cyclonically incoming and rising air. Although multi-vortex structures are common in tornadoes, they are not unique to them and can occur in other circulations, such as dust devils. This is a natural result of vortex dynamics in physics. Multi-vortex tornadoes should not be confused with cyclically tornadic supercells. Supercells are large, rotating thunderstorms that can produce multiple, distinct tornadoes, often referred to as tornado families. These tornadoes may form at different times or exist simultaneously but are separate from one another.

A phenomenon similar to multiple vortices is the satellite tornado. Unlike the multiple-vortex tornado, where smaller vortices form inside the main tornado, a satellite tornado develops outside the main tornado's circulation. It forms through a different mechanism, typically as a result of interactions with the parent storm's environment. Despite appearing close to the primary tornado, satellite tornadoes are independent and can have their own rotation.

In rare instances, multi-vortex tornadoes may display their strength through the uncommon method of "horizontal vortices", in which tornadoes appearing to "bend" their multiple interior vortices; this results in a tornado appearing to radiate thin lines. Examples of tornadoes featuring horizontal vortices include the 2011 Tuscaloosa EF4 and 1999 Bridge Creek-Moore F5 tornadoes.

== Notable tornadoes ==
The largest tornado ever documented was a multiple-vortex tornado. It struck El Reno, Oklahoma, on May 31, 2013, as a rain-wrapped tornado, killing tornado researcher Tim Samaras, his son Paul, their TWISTEX colleague Carl Young, and local amateur storm chaser Richard Henderson. It had a maximum width of 2.6 miles (4.2 km) and a maximum recorded windspeed of at least 313 miles per hour (504 km/h). However, because of a lack of intense property damage, the tornado achieved a rating of EF3 on the Enhanced Fujita scale. Nevertheless, the El Reno tornado is one of the three strongest tornadoes ever recorded in terms of maximum wind speeds, the next being the 2024 Greenfield EF4 tornado, reaching a measured windspeed of possibly up to 318 miles per hour (512 km/h), the last being the 1999 Bridge Creek–Moore tornado which doppler weather radar measured 321 miles per hour (517 km/h) mph. The Greenfield tornado also displayed multiple vortices.

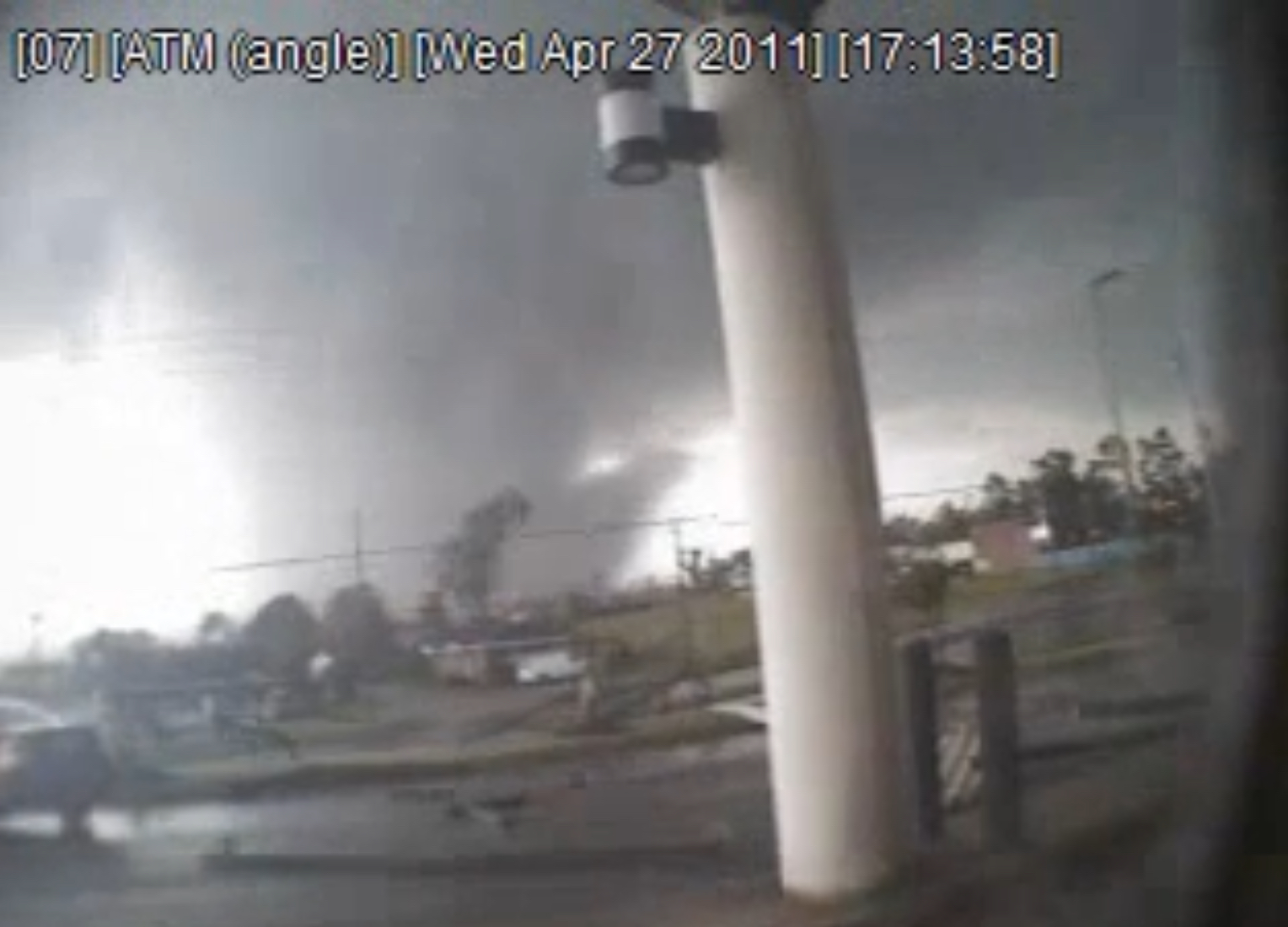
The 2011 Tuscaloosa-Birmingham tornado in CCTV footage. Note that this image does not display horizontal vortices, however the right side of the tornado does appear to have a visible representation of a suction vortex.

The 1893 Pomeroy tornado was one of the most violent examples of a multi-vortex tornado. The 1997 Jarrell tornado was another example of a multiple-vortex tornado. The infamous “Dead Man Walking” photo of it was at a juvenile stage of sub-vortices development. The 2011 Cullman–Arab tornado is also famous for footage of it "walking" while in its multi-vortex stage, as well as the 2013 El Reno tornado, which also had footage of it "walking" while multi-vortex.

== See also ==
- Tornadogenesis
