= Reino =

Reino is the Portuguese, Galician and Spanish word for kingdom and may refer to:

- Reino, Campania, a town in the province of Benevento, Italy

== People ==
=== Surname ===
Reino is a Spanish surname. Notable people with this surname include:

- Fernando Gómez-Reino (born 1955), Spanish swimmer
- Helen Reino, maiden name of Helen Klaos (born 1983), Estonian badminton player

=== Given name ===
Reino is a Finnish male given name. Notable people with this name include:

- Reino Aarnio (1912–1988), American architect
- Reino Börjesson (1929–2023), Swedish football player
- Reino Gikman (allegedly born 1930, disappeared 1989), alias used by an undercover agent for the Soviet KGB
- Reino Hallamaa (1899–1979), Finnish colonel
- Reino Helismaa (1913–1965), Finnish singer-songwriter
- Reino Häyhänen (1920–1961), Soviet intelligence officer of the KGB
- Reino Kangasmäki (1916–2010), Finnish journalist and Greco-Roman wrestler
- Reino Kuivamäki (1918–1982), Finnish athlete
- Reino Kuuskoski (1907–1965), Finnish jurist
- Reino Nordin (born 1983), Finnish actor and musician
- Reino Oittinen (1912–1978), Finnish politician
- Reino Paasilinna (1939–2022), Finnish politician
- Reino Poutanen (1928–2007), Finnish rower
- Reino Ragnar Lehto (1898–1966), Finnish politician
- Reino Valkama (1906–1962), Finnish actor

== See also ==
- Reno (disambiguation)
