= Tornado outbreak of May 26–31, 2013 =

Tornado outbreak in the United States

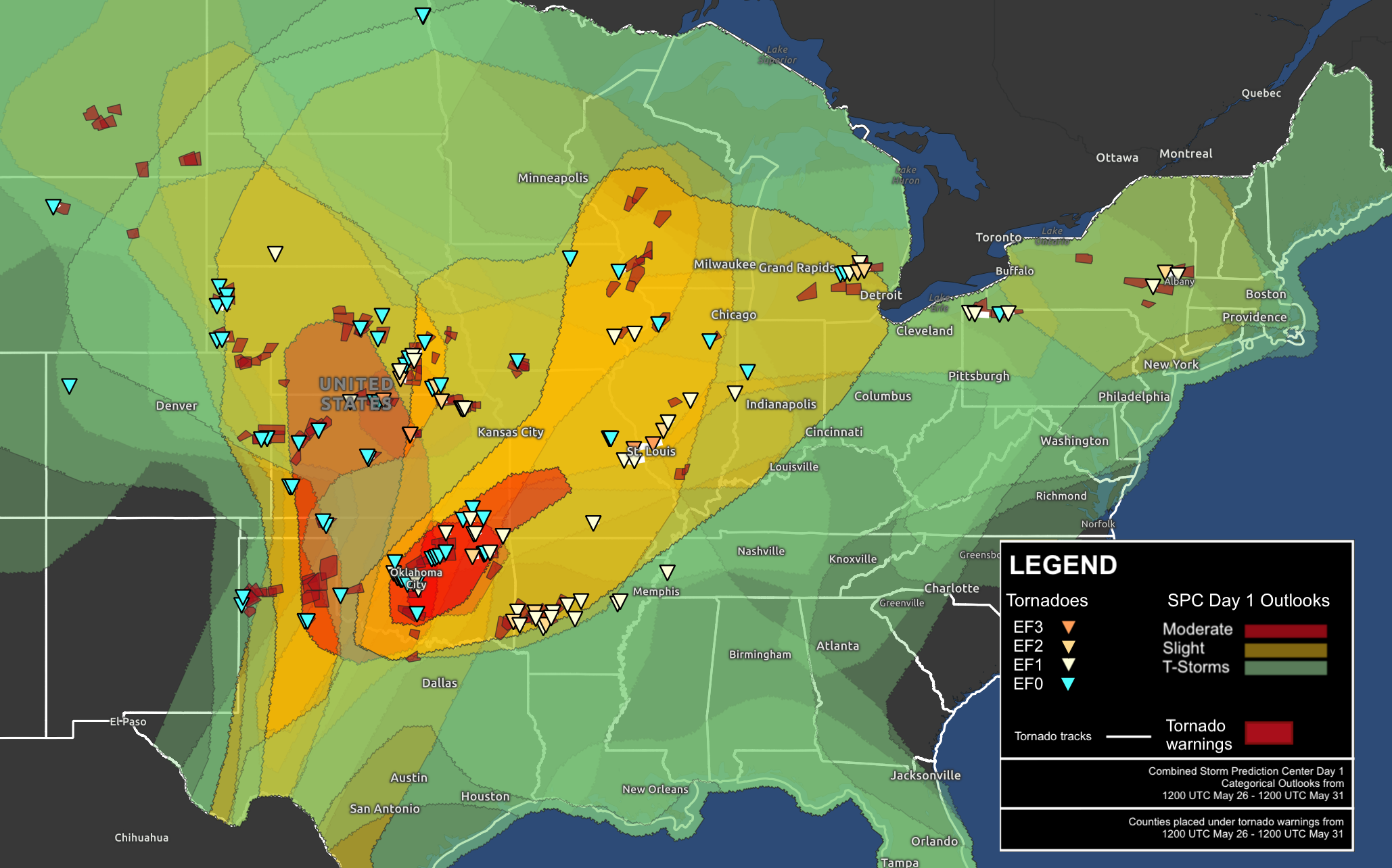
- Map of tornado warnings and confirmed tornadoes from the outbreak (from May 26–31)

Meteorological history
- Duration: May 26–31, 2013

Tornado outbreak
- Tornadoes: 134
- Max. rating: EF3 tornado
- Duration: 5 days, 10 hours, 43 minutes
- Highest winds: Tornadic – 160 mph (260 km/h)* (Roxana, Illinois EF3 on May 31)*; *A 313 mph (504 km/h) gust was measured by mobile doppler weather radar near El Reno, Oklahoma. (Note: The National Weather Service does not currently implement wind speed estimates into its official tornado ratings, so while the winds align with the "EF5" category of the Enhanced Fujita scale, damage surveys took precedence. As a result, while the wind estimates are considered reliable by the NWS, the tornado ultimately received a rating of "EF3" based on a damage survey (in the weeks before this, it was considered an "EF5").)
- Highest gusts: Non-tornadic – 87 mph (140 km/h) (Tinker Air Force Base, OK non-tornadic on May 31)
- Largest hail: 5.25 inches (13.3 cm) in diameter NW of Montrose, Kansas on May 27

Extratropical cyclone
- Lowest pressure: 989 hPa (mbar); 29.21 inHg
- Max. rainfall: 7–12 in (18–30 cm) near Oklahoma City, Oklahoma

Overall effects
- Fatalities: 9 (+18 non-tornadic)
- Injuries: 172 injuries
- Damage: $2.3 billion (2013 USD)
- Areas affected: High Plains, Central and Eastern United States
- Power outages: 211,000
- Part of the tornado outbreaks of 2013

A prolonged and widespread tornado outbreak affected a large portion of the United States in the final days of May 2013. The outbreak was the result of a slow-moving but powerful storm system that produced several strong tornadoes across the Great Plains states, especially in Kansas and Oklahoma. Other strong tornadoes caused severe damage in Nebraska, Missouri, Illinois, and Michigan. The outbreak extended as far east as Upstate New York. 27 fatalities were reported in total, with nine resulting from tornadoes (eight in Oklahoma and one in Arkansas).

By far, the most significant tornado of the outbreak was an extremely large EF3 tornado that struck areas near the town of El Reno, Oklahoma on May 31. With a maximum width of 2.6 miles (4.2 km), it was the largest tornado on record. The second-highest wind speeds recorded by a Doppler radar, up to 313 miles per hour (504 km/h), were also observed in this tornado. The tornado was responsible for eight deaths, including famous storm chaser Tim Samaras, his son Paul, and Carl Young as a result of being caught off-guard by the tornado's unprecedented width, with the addition of amateur stormchaser, Richard Henderson. In addition, the tornado caused 151 injures.

== Meteorological synopsis ==
On May 22, an upper-level low moved eastward over the Western United States, with forward progression limited by a blocking high around the Northern Plains and Great Lakes. With ample low-level moisture streaming north ahead of the low into an area of moderate instability, scattered severe weather was anticipated over parts of Colorado, Kansas, and Nebraska starting on May 24.

=== May 26–28 ===
The first tornado associated with the system was a small landspout tornado that touched down in rural Idaho on May 26. The tornadic activity became more intense the following day. On May 27, while only scattered tornadoes touched down, four of them were strong and caused considerable damage in parts of Kansas and Nebraska. One tornado near Lebanon, Kansas reached EF3 intensity which the TIV 2 had intercepted and an EF2 near Marysville caused major damage to several structures. In Nebraska, the town of Edgar took a direct hit from an EF2.

Vigorous tornado activity continued on May 28. While the Storm Prediction Center only issued a slight risk that day, widespread tornadoes touched down in several states, some strong to violent. Several powerful supercell thunderstorms developed in central Kansas that afternoon, and large tornadoes were reported. Near the town of Corning, a strong EF3 carved an unusual V-shaped path through rural areas west of town, and completely destroyed two homes. An even larger tornado, an EF3 wedge that was over a quarter mile wide, touched down just west of Bennington, and remained nearly stationary in a field for over an hour. This tornado resulted in relatively moderate damage, but killed over 100 head of livestock. The tornado was originally rated EF4 based on mobile radar readings, but ground surveys did not reveal damage indicative of EF4 wind speeds, and the tornado was downgraded to an EF3 as a result. Later that evening, large tornadoes were sighted in southern Michigan, prompting several tornado emergencies. A total of six tornadoes were confirmed to have touched down in areas near Flint, two of which reached EF2 intensity and caused significant damage. Numerous weak tornadoes were documented in other states.

=== May 29–30 ===
On May 29, the Storm Prediction Center issued a moderate risk for parts of Texas, Oklahoma, and Kansas. The outlook included a 10% hatched risk for tornadoes. A separate slight risk was issued for parts of New England. In the main risk area, only scattered weak tornadoes touched down, though a mile-wide EF2 wedge tornado touched down in upstate New York near Schenectady. On May 30, for the second day in a row, the Storm Prediction Center issued a moderate risk with a 10% hatched risk of tornadoes, this time for eastern Oklahoma and a small part of Kansas. Numerous tornadoes touched down in Oklahoma and Arkansas, including a few that were strong. An EF2 ripped through the Tulsa suburb of Broken Arrow, resulting in severe damage to homes and businesses. A brief EF1 near Tull, Arkansas unfortunately caused a fatality due to a falling tree.

=== May 31 ===
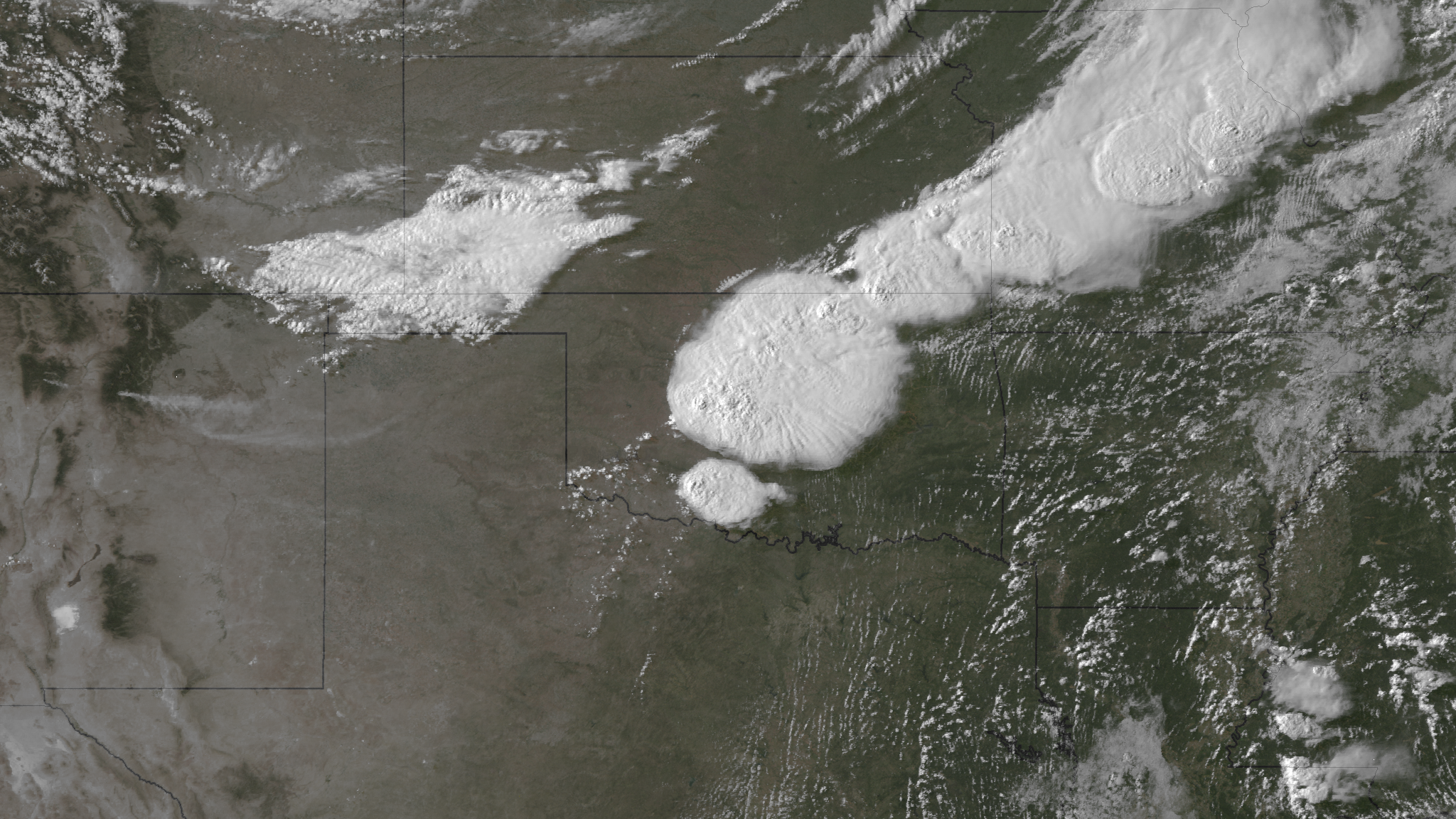
The storm system responsible for the tornado outbreak at 6:10 p.m. CDT May 31

On the morning of May 31, a strong cap was in place over much of central Oklahoma into eastern Oklahoma. With dewpoints creeping into the low 70s, the Storm Prediction Center early on considered upgrading part of the moderate risk forecast zone to a high risk forecast zone. As the day went on, there was no upgrade, but it became evident the atmosphere was ripe with CAPE values in excess of 4000 J/kg. With the presence of an extremely unstable air mass over central Oklahoma, the Storm Prediction Center issued a Particularly Dangerous Situation Tornado Watch for much of the state during the afternoon of May 31 and lasting into the night. Later that evening, severe storms rapidly developed, and an extremely large and violent multiple-vortex tornado devastated areas near El Reno, Oklahoma, and killed eight people including amateur storm chaser Richard Henderson, and the three men from the storm chasing crew, TWISTEX. The tornado had been rated EF5 based on mobile radar readings, Other weak tornadoes and major flooding devastated parts of the Oklahoma City metro that evening. Further north, a powerful squall line of severe storms with several embedded strong tornadoes developed in Missouri. One of the tornadoes, a large and rain-wrapped EF3, caused major damage in several St. Louis suburbs. Weak tornadoes touched down in several other states.

== Confirmed tornadoes ==
Confirmed tornadoes by Enhanced Fujita rating
| EFU | EF0 | EF1 | EF2 | EF3 | EF4 | EF5 | Total |
|---|---|---|---|---|---|---|---|
| 0 | 73 | 43 | 12 | 6 | 0 | 0 | 134 |

=== Bennington, Kansas ===
Bennington, Kansas
- The large tornado over open fields in Ottawa County near Bennington.

Meteorological history
- Formed: May 28, 2013, 5:45 p.m. CDT (UTC−05:00)
- Dissipated: May 28, 2013, 6:45 p.m. CDT (UTC−05:00)
- Duration: 1 hour

EF3 tornado
- on the Enhanced Fujita scale
- Highest winds: Official intensity: >150 mph (240 km/h); Radar-estimated: 264 mph (425 km/h) (estimate via RaXPol radar analysis)

Overall effects
- Fatalities: 0
- Injuries: 0

This large, very slow-moving, and erratic tornado remained on the ground for just over an hour as it executed a cyclonic loop in Ottawa County south of the town of Minneapolis and west of Bennington. It initially touched down several miles west of Bennington on May 28 at 5:45 p.m. CDT (2239 UTC). Upon formation, it snapped power poles and moved southeast before turning north as it approached U.S. Route 81. As the tornado reached the northern end of the track (its strongest point), it swept away a machinery shed, with one combine harvester stored inside being thrown and torn apart. Trees and shrubs were completely debarked. Ground scouring occurred and a large semi-like truck was moved several feet and tipped over. About 1000 cattle were killed in this area as well. The tornado then moved to the southwest and destroyed the roof of a well constructed shed and throwing the heavy metal shed door into a field, blew a trailer 40 yards (37 m), snapped many more power poles, and downed numerous trees. A home that was under construction lost all four exterior walls and a fifth-wheel camper was blown 200 yards (180 m). A second home suffered minor shingle damage and impact dents in the siding from flying debris, a few more sheds/outbuildings were either damaged or destroyed, and a third home had siding and chimney damage (mostly from debris impact) and was slightly moved off of the foundation. The tornado lifted around 6:45 p.m. CDT (2345 UTC), just to the south-southwest of where it touched down.

Radar loop of the supercell responsible for the Bennington tornado

Initially, the tornado was rated as an EF4, with the rating based on Doppler on Wheels surface wind measurements, which indicated a far larger and stronger tornado. Gusts were measured far into the EF5 intensity range, with a peak value of 247 mph (398 km/h); however, those winds were measured 300 ft (91 m) above the surface. However, DOW windspeed measurements were found to be almost 264 mph near the core (47m above ground level). Based on damage indicators and the surface wind measurements, the highest winds that translated to the ground were around 150 mph (240 km/h). Because mobile doppler radar data is not a method by which tornadoes are rated, it was later officially downgraded to an EF3. Despite the downgrade, the National Climatic Data Center maintains that the Bennington tornado was violent, and likely reached EF4 intensity at some point in its life. The wind gusts above the surface were among the highest ever measured/estimated on record, comparable to the highest non-tornadic gust of 253 mph (407 km/h) measured during Cyclone Olivia in 1996. Some damage was observed from areas that were not directly in the path of the tornado, suggesting a very large wind field as well. Winds of 150 mph (240 km/h) were also measured over an area approximately 0.5 mi (0.80 km) wide while 100 mph (160 km/h) winds covered an area 1.5 mi (2.4 km) in diameter. Due to the tornado's slow motion, several areas in its path were likely exposed to winds well in excess of 100 mph (160 km/h) for at least 45 minutes.

=== El Reno–Yukon, Oklahoma ===
El Reno–Yukon, Oklahoma
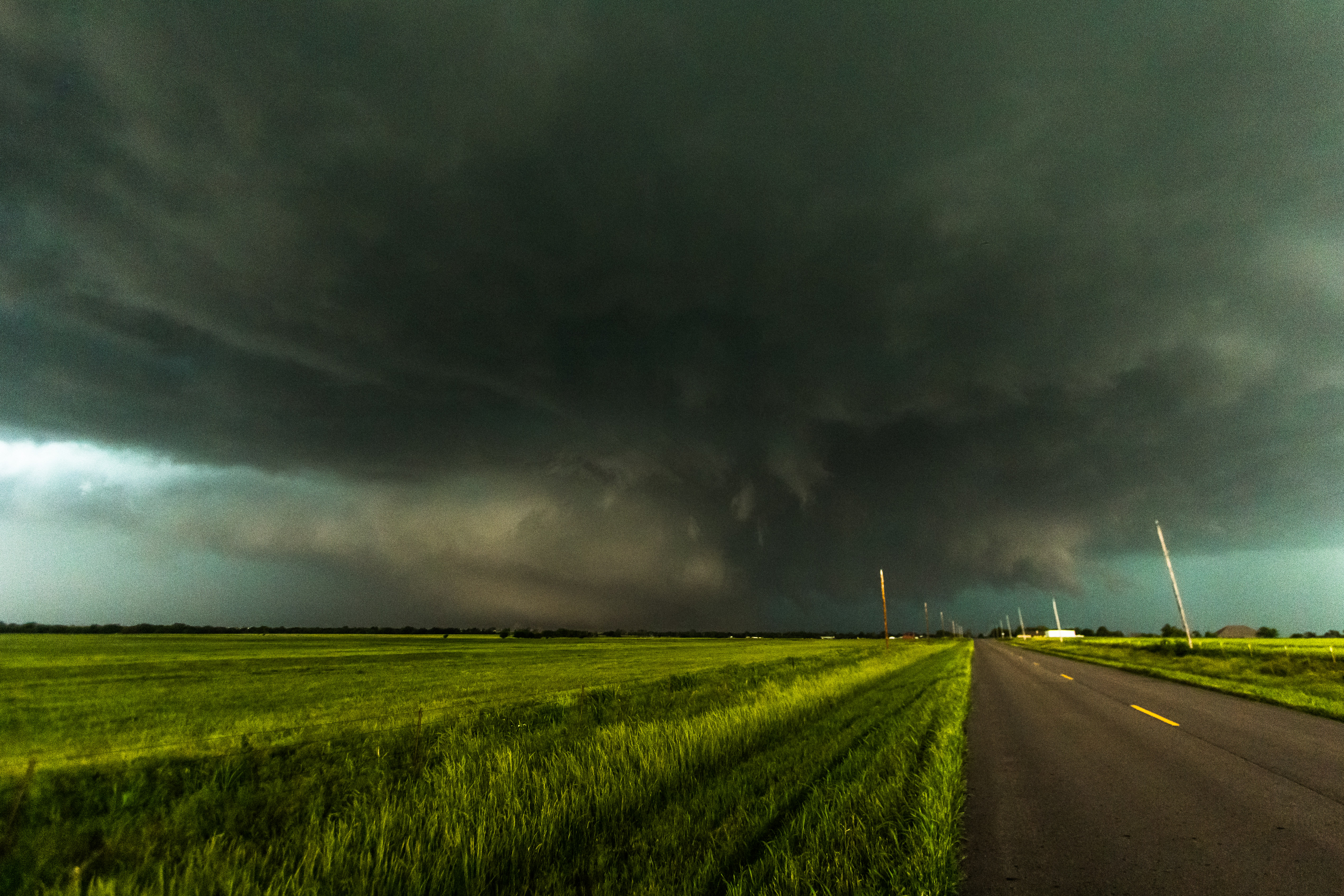
- The tornado near peak strength as seen from just north of Banner Rd and 15th Street.

Meteorological history
- Formed: May 31, 2013, 6:03 p.m. CDT (UTC−05:00)
- Dissipated: May 31, 2013, 6:43 p.m. CDT (UTC−05:00)
- Duration: 40 minutes

EF3 tornado
- on the Enhanced Fujita scale
- Highest winds: Official intensity: >155 mph (249 km/h); Radar-estimated: 313 mph (504 km/h) (estimate via RaXPol radar analysis)

Overall effects
- Fatalities: 8
- Injuries: 151

This erratic, powerful and enormous tornado touched down from a large and low-based wall cloud about 8.3 miles (13.4 km) west-southwest of El Reno just northeast of the intersection of Heaston and Reuter roads at 6:03 p.m. CDT (2303 UTC). Initially, the tornado moved to the southeast at 20–25 miles per hour (32–40 km/h). At 6:09 p.m., the tornado turned to the east, just south of Reno Road between Heaston and Brandley roads. The tornado continued to expand in size just southwest of the El Reno Municipal Air Park, where its speed increased to 30–40 miles per hour (48–64 km/h). As the tornado passed just south of the airport, two satellite tornadoes formed briefly on the west side of the tornado. The tornado continued to track eastward and rapidly grew and became violent. Remaining over mostly open terrain, it did not impact many structures; however, measurements from mobile Doppler radars revealed extreme winds in excess of 313 mph (504 km/h) within the tornado. As it crossed US 81, it had grown to a record-breaking width of 2.6 miles (4.2 km), larger than any other tornado in recorded history. At 6:19 p.m. the tornado crossed Highway 81 near Reno Road as it continued to expand in size. There, the tornado abruptly turned to the north, while also accelerating to greater than 50 miles per hour (80 km/h). From 6:24 to 6:26 p.m., the tornado reached its maximum intensity near the intersection of Radio and Reuter roads. The tornado, still very large, slowed down as it approached I-40. From 6:27 to 6:35 the tornado made a loop just north of the interstate while decelerating to less than 10 miles per hour (16 km/h). the tornado dissipated around 6:43 p.m. CDT (2343 UTC) after tracking for 16.2 miles (26.1 km). An EF2 anticyclonic satellite tornado also occurred and such companion tornadoes tend to be observed with especially large and intense tornadoes.

Although the tornado remained over mostly open terrain, dozens of storm chasers unaware of its immense size were caught off-guard. Along US 81, renowned chaser and researcher Tim Samaras, along with his son Paul and research partner Carl Young, were killed when their vehicle was tossed by the tornado or a sub-vortex associated with it. Another amateur storm chaser was killed in the area. Other storm chasers, including The Weather Channel's Mike Bettes as well as Reed Timmer, were either injured or had their vehicles damaged. Overall, the tornado was responsible for eight fatalities and an 151 injuries.

=== Weldon Spring–Northern St. Louis County, Missouri ===
Weldon Spring–Northern St. Louis County, Missouri
- The rain-wrapped tornado as seen from Francis Howell High School in Weldon Spring.

Meteorological history
- Formed: May 31, 2013, 7:50 p.m. CDT (UTC−05:00)
- Dissipated: May 31, 2013, 8:25 p.m. CDT (UTC−05:00)
- Duration: 35 minutes

EF3 tornado
- on the Enhanced Fujita scale
- Highest winds: 150 mph (240 km/h)

Overall effects
- Fatalities: 0
- Injuries: 2

This large rain-wrapped tornado touched down at 7:50 p.m. CDT (0050 UTC) on May 31, southwest of Weldon Spring in St. Charles County, Missouri. It first produced EF1 damage as it downed trees, blew over empty trailers, and caused minor damage to construction equipment. It moved generally east-northeast into Weldon Spring Heights (on the south side of Weldon Spring) and caused roof, window, and solar panel damage to a few structures as well as downing more trees before crossing Interstate 64. The tornado continued moving east-northeast through densely populated residential areas of southern St. Charles County. Roofing was torn off of a middle school and blown 100 yards (91 m), many houses suffered varying degrees of roof (from minor damage to removal of entire roof), wall (from minor damage to total collapse), and overall structural damage, and hundreds of trees were downed. Damage in this area ranged from EF1 to EF2. A shed was destroyed, a garage door was compromised and the roof was removed and blown away, another garage had a wall collapsed, and two more garages were completely destroyed. The tornado reached its maximum intensity to the east-northeast of Weldon Spring, west-southwest of St. Charles and Harvester, and south of St. Peters. Three adjacent frame homes at this location sustained total loss of their roofs and exterior walls, and this small pocket of damage was rated EF3. The tornado continued causing damage in residential areas further to the east and northeast, snapping many trees and causing roof and wall damage to many homes. A few homes had their roofs entirely ripped off, and damage along this portion of the path was rated EF1 to EF2. Crossing the Missouri River, the tornado moved into St. Louis County and Earth City, Bridgeton, and the northern side of Maryland Heights as it moved along Interstate 70 near its intersection with Interstate 270.

The tornado produced a mixture of EF1 and EF2 damage in this densely built-up commercial and industrial area. A casino on the east bank of the river had roof and siding damage and a tree limb was thrown into one of the walls. Many trees, power poles, and highway signs were downed in the area, a hotel sustained shingle and window damage, and the canopy was damaged at a Mobil gas station. The roof was damaged and windows were broken at an ITT Technical Institute building and a vehicle was flipped in the parking lot. Nearby, large doors were blown in at a warehouse-type building and three delivery trucks were blown over. Trees and power lines were downed and several homes and commercial buildings were damaged at mainly EF1 strength in nearby Bridgeton to the east of SSM DePaul Health Center. One apartment building in Bridgeton sustained EF2 damage, and debris fell onto vehicles and trees fell onto houses in the area as well. The tornado weakened to EF1 strength and maintained this intensity for the remainder of its path. It moved just north of the St. Louis base of the Missouri Air National Guard at Lambert–St. Louis International Airport in Berkeley (which had previously taken a direct hit from an EF4 tornado on April 22, 2011), causing tree and power pole damage. The tornado moved into residential areas on the northern side of Ferguson, downing trees and power poles, a few of which landed on homes and cars. More trees were downed and one home suffered minor roof damage in the Dellwood area. The tornado downed even more trees as it crossed Interstate 270 again east of Florissant. Several trees landed on houses in the area and seven power poles were snapped along the interstate. The tornado moved north of Bellefontaine Neighbors, then northeast of town as it moved along Interstate 270. 2-foot (61 cm) in diameter trees were downed, one of which fell onto a house. It moved due east, causing widespread tree damage as it moved into the Riverview area in the extreme northeastern sections of the City of St. Louis. The tornado downed many trees on the banks of the Mississippi River, where it lifted at 8:25 p.m. (0125 UTC) just northeast of exit 34 on Interstate 270. The tornado was rated a mid-grade EF3, with winds up to 150 mph (240 km/h). It was on the ground for 35 minutes, traveled 32.5 miles (52.3 km), and had a maximum path width of 1 mile (1.6 km). Two minor injuries occurred in St. Charles County.

=== Columbia Bottom, Missouri/Roxana–South Roxana, Illinois ===
Columbia Bottom, Missouri/Roxana–South Roxana, Illinois
- High-end EF3 damage to an industrial warehouse in South Roxana, Illinois.

Meteorological history
- Formed: May 31, 2013, 8:27 p.m. CDT (UTC−05:00)
- Dissipated: May 31, 2013, 8:37 p.m. CDT (UTC−05:00)
- Duration: 10 minutes

EF3 tornado
- on the Enhanced Fujita scale
- Highest winds: 160 mph (260 km/h)

Overall effects
- Fatalities: 0
- Injuries: 0

This short lived, yet intense tornado first touched down at 8:27 p.m. CDT (UTC-05:00) near The Columbia Bottom Conservation Area, about 3 miles northeast of the interchange of I-270 and Columbia Bottom Road. The tornado uprooted a large tree in this area, and quickly began to move northeast, and would uproot another tree just northeast of Upper Columbia Bottom Road, before turning slightly more eastward as it crossed The Mississippi River into Madison County, Illinois. After crossing into the state of Illinois, the tornado would quickly blow down several trees upon making landfall on the southern side of Roxana. As it continued to travel east-northeast, the tornado blew off a chunk of the roof away from a business on the northwest corner of the intersection of Illinois Route 3 and Piasa Lane. On The eastern side of Illinois Route 3, the tornado caused minor EF1 rated damage to a gas station. As it continued traveling further northeast, the tornado snapped several power poles along S. Delmar Avenue. Just south of the intersection between Robbins Road and Illinois Route 111, 5 large power poles were snapped and there was a convergent pattern in the tree damage to the north. As the tornado continued across portions of South Roxana, it caused minor damage to several homes before crossing Highway 255. The tornado would hit a large steel framework building, causing one of the walls to buckle, and also managed to twist the roof steel girders from a nearby landfill just south of Old Alton Edwardsville Road, about a quarter of a mile east of the intersection of Old Alton Edwardsville Road and Section Line Road. In the same area, the tornado would strike an exceptionally well-built, wood-framed storage building, which would end up getting completely destroyed by the tornado. The tornado continued towards the northeast, now weakening, and continuing to snap numerous trees, including multiple fir trees, and also snapped another power pole. The tornado dissipated around 8:27 p.m. CDT (UTC-05:00) west of Cahokia Creek.

The tornado was rated EF3 with winds up to 160 mph (260 km/h). The tornado had a path length of 10.6 mi (17.1 km), and had a maximum path width of 150 yd (140 m).

== Non-tornadic effects ==
On May 28, Amarillo, Texas was battered by a major hailstorm. An estimated 35,000 vehicles and thousands of homes were damaged in the storm, with insured losses expected to reach $400 million.

=== Flooding impacts ===
In addition to the tornadoes, the Oklahoma City metro area was subjected to severe flash flooding on May 31 and into the early morning hours of June 1, with initial estimates of 7–12 in (180–300 mm) of rain having fallen as storms continued to train across the area during the evening and overnight hours. The flooding combined with damage from the tornadoes complicated efforts of emergency services personnel to render aid to areas impacted by the storm. With the flooding and tornadoes occurring simultaneously, a family of seven sought refuge from a tornado in a drainage ditch in southern Oklahoma City. They were soon overwhelmed by flood waters and a four-year-old boy was swept away and died. An infant was also swept away but was rescued and hospitalized in critical condition. At least nine people were killed as a result of the floods. One person remained missing as of June 3. This became the deadliest floods in Oklahoma since 1984.

On May 29, a man was killed by a falling tree in Verona, New York during a severe thunderstorm. Flash flooding in Scott County, Arkansas killed four people, including a sheriff. Missouri authorities confirmed three deaths as a result of high water that occurred in the counties of Lawrence, Miller and Reynolds.

== Aftermath ==
More than 210,000 customers were left without power: 89,000 in Missouri, 86,000 in Oklahoma, 31,000 in Illinois, 3,000 in Arkansas, 1,000 in Kansas, and 500 in Indiana. According to the state transportation department, portions of more than 200 roads in Oklahoma were closed due to flooding. On May 31, the National Oceanic and Atmospheric Administration (NOAA) announced it would no longer furlough employees under sequestration due to the outbreak of tornadoes. A baseball game between the Saint Louis Cardinals and San Francisco Giants was postponed due to the storm. Another baseball game between the Texas Rangers and Arizona Diamondbacks was postponed. Following the storms, Will Rogers World Airport lost power.

== See also ==
- List of North American tornadoes and tornado outbreaks
  - List of tornadoes with confirmed satellite tornadoes
- Tornado outbreak of May 18–21, 2013 – a similar outbreak that occurred around a week earlier
