= Ittie Kinney Reno =

American novelist

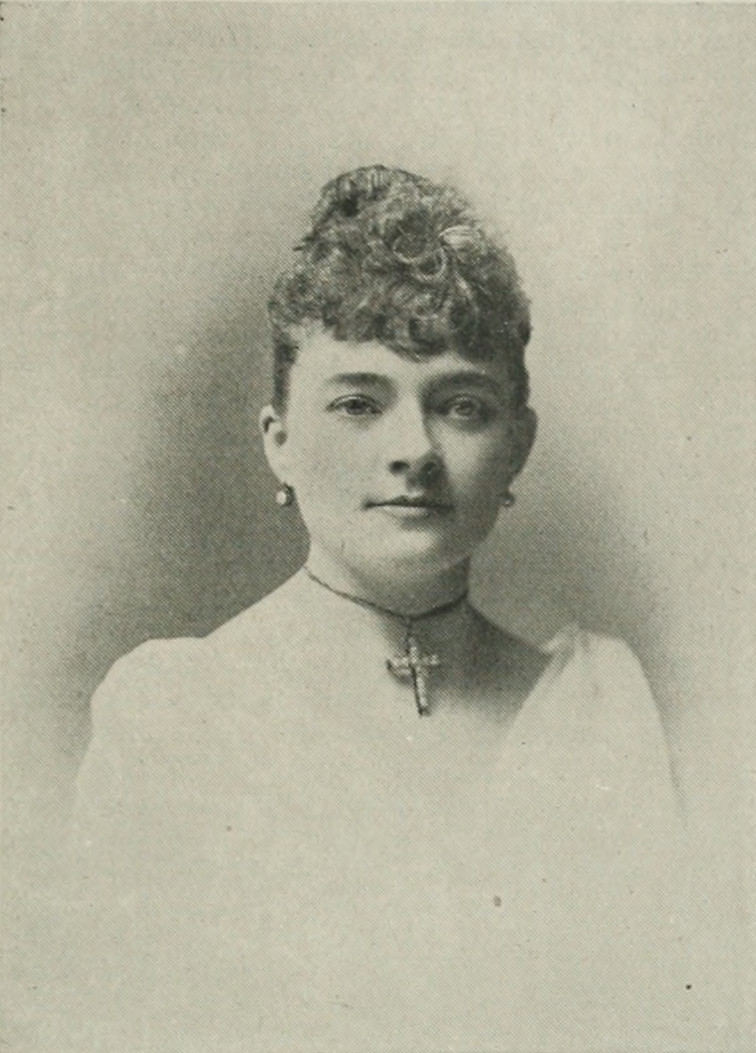
Ittie Kinney Reno, A Woman of the Century

Ittie Kinney Reno (May 17, 1862 - June 5, 1941) was a novelist and social leader.

== Early life ==
Ittie Kinney Reno was born in Nashville, Tennessee, on May 17, 1862. She was the daughter of Col. George S. Kinney, of Nashville. She was a high-strung, imaginative child, remarkably bright and precocious, and while still very young she was sent to a convent in Kentucky, where she remained until her education was completed.

She was graduated with first honors, and her valedictory was delivered in the form of an original poem. Her debut was marked by the brilliance that wealth and social influence confer, and soon she became one of the belles of Tennessee's capital.

== Career ==
In the summer of 1889, she began to write a romance, entirely for self-amusement, with no thought of publication. She kept her work a secret till its completion, and then she laughingly gave it to her mother for criticism. Her parents insisted on publication, but Réno declined. Finally, she allowed her father to submit her manuscript to his friend, Hon. Henry Watterson, and to abide by his decision. Watterson read and pronounced it "a genuine southern love story, full of the fragrance of southern flowers and instinct with the rich, warm blood of southern youth." He gave the young author some letters to eastern publishers, and her first novel, Miss Breckenridge, a Daughter of Dixie (Philadelphia, 1890), was published. It proved successful, and within a few months it had passed through five editions. Her second book, An Exceptional Case (Philadelphia, 1891), it also proved to be a success.

In 1903, she won the second prize offered by the editor of the American Home Magazine, published in New York, in a story contest, in which magazine and newspaper writers in all parts of the country were competing. As a consequence, Reno was placed on the regular staff of contributors to the magazine. Her story was "Rattlesnake Jim".

In 1908, she won the US$500 offered as first prize in a story contest by Everybody's Magazine. In the contest, 1.000 manuscripts were submitted.

== Personal life ==
On May 21, 1885, she married Robert Ross Réno of Harrisburg, Tennessee, only child of M. A. Réno, Major of the 7th Cavalry Regiment, famous for the defense of his men during two days and nights of horror, from the overwhelming force of Sioux, who the day before had massacred Custer's entire battalion. Through his mother, Robert Ross Reno was related to some of the oldest families in Pennsylvania. He was one of the heirs of Philippe Francois Renault (anglicized Reno), who arrived in Tennessee with Lafayette, and who left an estate valued at $200,000,000 ($200,000,000 in 1893 are $5,183,398,623.61 in 2017). For several years after her marriage, Reno led the life of a young woman of fashion and elegance. Reno lived in luxurious surroundings in a sumptuous home on Capitol Hill.

She died on June 5, 1941, and is buried at Cave Hill Cemetery, Nashville.
