= Stephen Reno =

Stephen J. Reno was Chancellor of the University System of New Hampshire from 2000 to 2009. The university system comprises four institutions, the University of New Hampshire, Keene State College, Plymouth State University, and Granite State College. He is currently the executive director of Leadership New Hampshire, a leadership development program created to "increase civic engagement and strengthen communities through connecting and educating a diverse pool of engaged or emerging leaders about the state of New Hampshire".

== Academic interests ==
Reno's academic interests and publications are in the areas of comparative symbolism, mythology, and ritual. Notable among his professional activities is his involvement with the Salzburg Seminar, committee service with the American Academy of Religion, and service as commissioner of the Northwest Association of Schools and Colleges.

Within the New Hampshire region, he served as head of the New Hampshire Delegation to the New England Board of Higher Education; vice chair of the New Hampshire Forum on Higher Education; member, board of directors, Leadership New Hampshire; member, board of directors, Business and Industry Association; and member, Assembly of Overseers, Mary Hitchcock Hospital, Dartmouth-Hitchcock Medical Center.

== Past posts ==
- Executive Director, Leadership New Hampshire (2010–present)
- Chancellor, University System of New Hampshire (2000–2009)
- President, Southern Oregon University (1994–2000)
- Provost, Southern Oregon University (1989–1994)
- Associate Provost, University of Southern Maine (1980–1989)
- Visiting Scholar, Harvard University (1979–1980)
- Associate Dean of Faculty, University of Leicester (1970–1979)

== Education ==
- MA and PhD in Religious Studies, University of California, Santa Barbara.
- AB in Philosophy, St. John's College (California)
