= 2013 El Reno tornado =

2013 EF3 tornado in Oklahoma, U.S.

Coordinates: 35°28′45″N 97°54′00″W

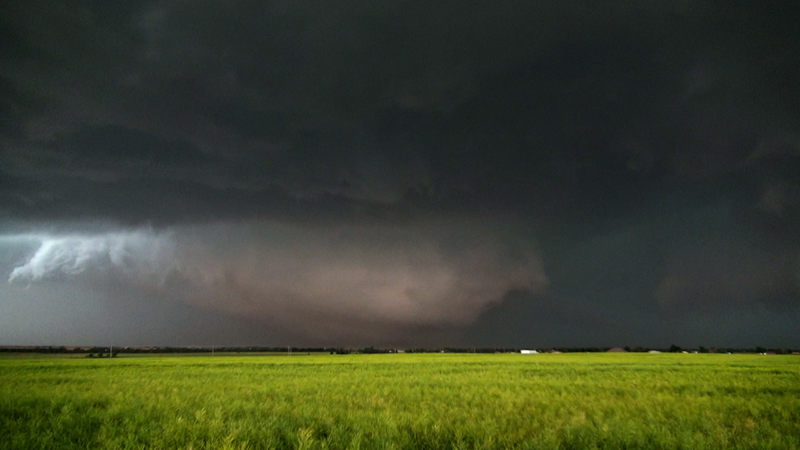
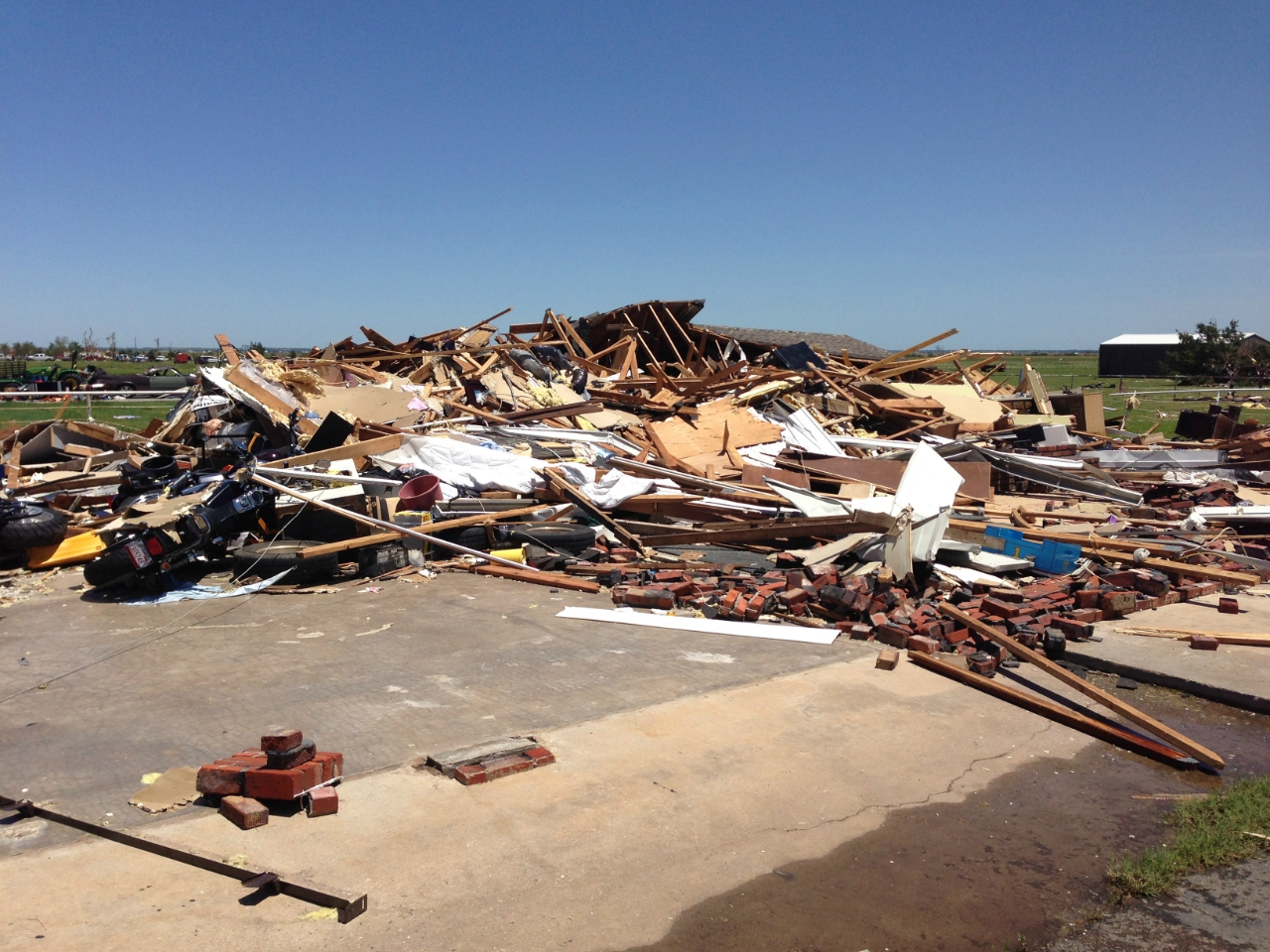
- Clockwise from top: View of the tornado from the southeast at 6:28 p.m. CDT (23:28 UTC) as it was nearing peak intensity; The highest rated damage indicator from the tornado, a home which had all walls collapsed; A Phased Array Radar loop showing the supercell as it produced the tornado.

Meteorological history
- Formed: May 31, 2013, 6:03 pm. CDT (UTC−05:00)
- Dissipated: May 31, 2013, 6:43 pm. CDT (UTC−05:00)
- Duration: 40 minutes

EF3 tornado
- on the Enhanced Fujita scale
- Max width: 4,576 yards (2.60 mi; 4.18 km) (Worldwide record width)
- Path length: 16.2 miles (26.1 km)
- Highest winds: Official intensity: >155 mph (249 km/h); Radar-estimated: 313 mph (504 km/h) (Second-highest worldwide; estimate via RaXPol radar analysis) (Note: The National Weather Service does not currently implement wind speed estimates into its official tornado ratings, so while the winds align with the "EF5" category of the Enhanced Fujita scale, damage surveys took precedence. As a result, while the wind estimates are considered reliable by the NWS, the tornado ultimately received a rating of "EF3" based on a damage survey (in the weeks before this, it was considered an "EF5"). The wind speeds that produced the EF3 damage were not disclosed.)

Satellite tornadoes
- Tornadoes: 3
- Max. rating: EF3 tornado

Overall effects
- Fatalities: 8
- Injuries: 151
- Areas affected: Canadian County, Oklahoma; especially areas to the south of El Reno
- Part of the tornado outbreak of May 26–31, 2013 and tornadoes of 2013

The 2013 El Reno tornado was an extremely large, intense, and erratic tornado that impacted rural areas of Central Oklahoma during the early evening of May 31, 2013. This rain-wrapped, multiple-vortex tornado was the widest tornado ever recorded, peaking at 2.6 miles across. It was part of a larger weather system that produced dozens of tornadoes over the preceding days. The tornado initially formed at 6:03 p.m. CDT (23:03 UTC) about 8.3 miles (13.4 km) west-southwest of El Reno, rapidly growing in size and becoming more violent as it tracked through central Canadian County. Remaining over mostly open terrain, the tornado did not impact many structures; however, measurements from mobile weather radars revealed extreme instantaneous winds in excess of 313 mph (504 km/h) within sub-vortices. These are among the highest recorded wind speeds, just slightly lower than the wind speeds of the 1999 Bridge Creek–Moore tornado. As it crossed U.S. 81, it had grown to a record-breaking width of 2.6 miles (4.2 km), beating the previous width record set in 2004. Turning northeastward, the tornado soon weakened. Upon crossing Interstate 40, the tornado dissipated around 6:43 p.m. CDT (23:43 UTC), after tracking for 16.2 miles (26.1 km). It avoided affecting more densely populated areas near and within the Oklahoma City metropolitan area.

The tornado killed four storm chasers (three professional and one amateur), the first known deaths in the history of storm chasing. Although the tornado remained over mostly open terrain, dozens of storm chasers unaware of its immense size and erratic movement were caught off-guard. Near U.S. 81, TWISTEX scientist and engineer Tim Samaras, along with his son Paul and research partner Carl Young, died in the tornado. Paul Samaras and Young were ejected from their Chevrolet Cobalt by the storm's sub-vortex, while Tim was still buckled in the passenger's seat. Local resident Richard Henderson, who decided to follow the storm, lost his life in that same area. He snapped a picture of the tornado from his cellular phone before it struck him. Other chasers, including Mike Bettes of The Weather Channel and Reed Timmer, either were injured or had their vehicles damaged. A Doppler on Wheels-based analysis of how the tornado impacted these teams revealed that they were hit by an intense internal sub-vortex. Overall, the tornado was responsible for eight fatalities and 151 injuries. Due to the ferocity and sheer size, as well as its irregular movement and the deaths linked with this tornado, it has become one of the most studied and infamous tornadoes ever. The National Weather Service referred to the tornado as "the most dangerous tornado in storm observing history".

Alongside rush hour traffic, thousands of residents in Oklahoma City attempted to outrun the storm by taking to the roads in an attempt to drive out of the tornado's projected path. By attempting to escape the storm by vehicle, in direct contrast to the recommended plan of action, residents put themselves at great risk from the storm; had the tornado maintained itself and passed over the congested freeways, more than 500 lives could have been lost.

== Meteorological synopsis ==
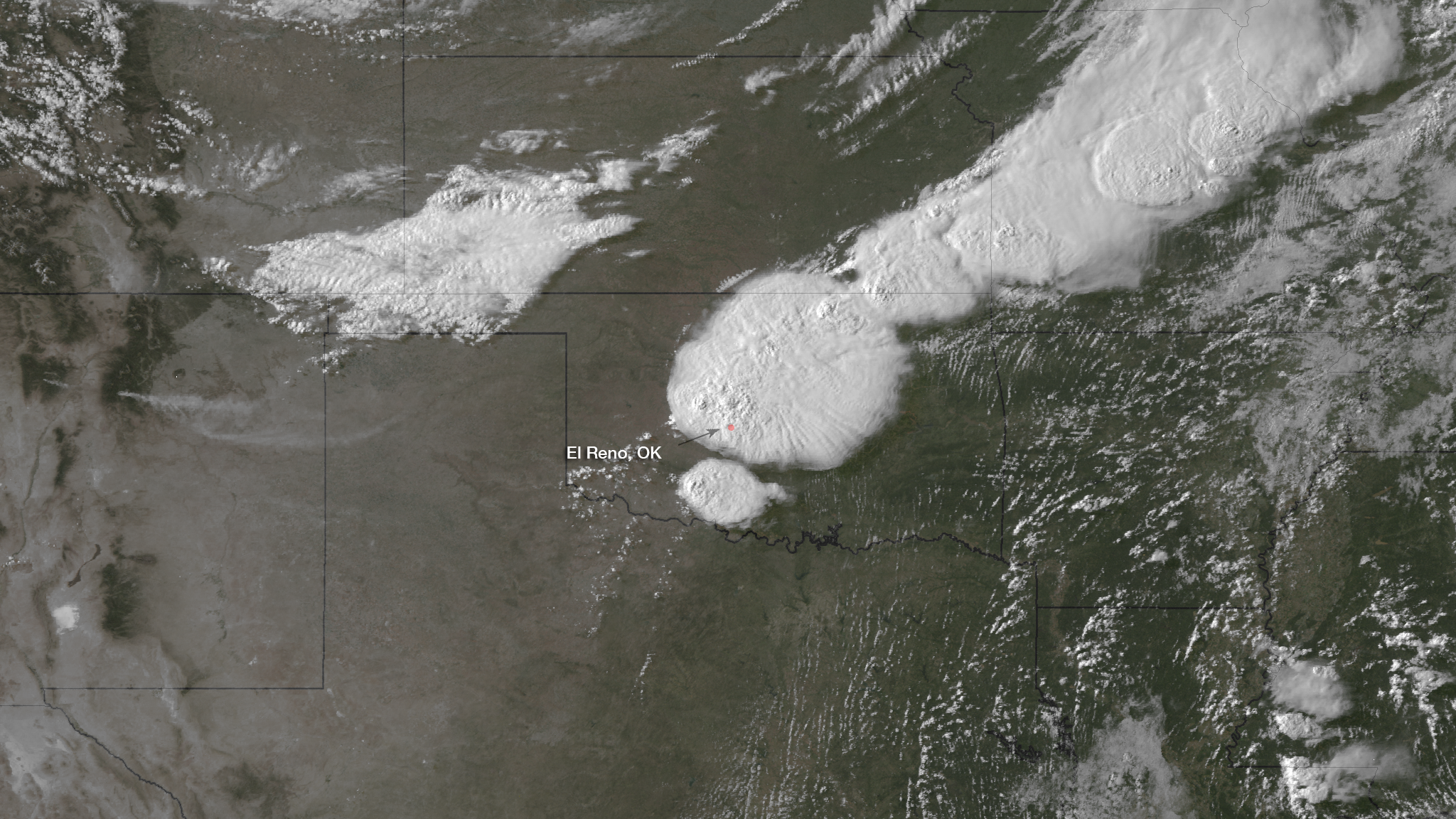
Satellite imagery of the storm system responsible for the May 26–31, 2013 tornado outbreak at 6:10 p.m. CDT

On May 31, 2013, a prominent mid-to-upper level trough and closed mid-level low pressure area moved east-northeastward, with a lead upper low pivoting over the Dakotas and Upper Midwest region. A moderately strong polar jet moved east-northeastward over the southern Rocky Mountains to the southern Great Plains. With a broad influence of moderately strong cyclonic flow aloft, the air mass was expected to become unstable across much of the southern Great Plains, through the Upper Midwest and Mississippi Valley, by the afternoon.

Dewpoint values ranged from the upper 60s °F (20 °C) to the lower 70s °F (20–22 °C), with temperatures in the low to mid-80s °F (27–30 °C), and CAPE (a meteorological concept used to predict the force and power of potential storms and tornadoes) predicting referring to values ranging from 3500 to 5000 J/kg. Deep layer wind shear speeds of 45–55 kn (52–63 mph) would enhance storm organization and intensity. These factors, along with CAPE values in excess of 4000 J/kg and an embedded speed maxima rotating around the southern periphery of the low, made the threat of significant severe thunderstorms increasingly likely. These ingredients were present ahead of a cold front extending from the low from the eastern Dakotas southwestward to western Oklahoma, and ahead of a dry line extending from western Oklahoma southward into western north and west-central Texas. The most intense severe weather activity was expected across the southern Great Plains, specifically central and eastern Oklahoma, during the afternoon. As such, the Storm Prediction Center (SPC) issued a moderate risk of severe thunderstorms during the early morning of May 31 from southeastern Missouri to southwestern Oklahoma. The degree of wind shear, moisture and instability within the warm sector favored the development of discrete supercells. Very large hail and tornadoes were expected with the supercells, with the possibility of a few strong to violent tornadoes.

At 3:30 p.m. Central Daylight Time (CDT) early that afternoon, the SPC issued a Particularly Dangerous Situation Tornado Watch from southwestern through northeastern Oklahoma, surrounding the Interstate 44 corridor.

== Tornado summary ==
=== Storm development and track ===
A quasi-linear complex of thunderstorms began developing near the Highway 81 corridor west of Oklahoma City between 4:00 and 4:45 p.m. CDT, and rapidly reached severe intensity. At 5:33 p.m. CDT (22:33 UTC), the National Weather Service Weather Forecast Office in Norman, Oklahoma issued a tornado warning for Canadian County, prompted by increasingly strong tornadic circulation exhibited in the southernmost supercell of this complex.

At 6:03 p.m. CDT (23:03 UTC), a large wall cloud formed and produced a tornado, initially in the form of several smaller sub-vortices, 8.3 miles (13.4 km) west-southwest of El Reno. The tornado ultimately attained EF3 intensity during its existence, according to ground surveys. At 6:15 p.m. CDT (23:15 UTC), the tornado deviated from its easterly path, doing a full loop before resuming its ESE motion. During its motion in this direction, two people were struck by the tornado and killed (an amateur storm chaser and a local resident). At 6:23 p.m. CDT (23:23 UTC), as the tornado passed south of El Reno across U.S. 81, it grew to an unprecedented width of 2.6 miles (4.2 km), becoming the widest known tornado ever recorded, simultaneously killing three professional storm chasers and another motorist driving nearby. (Note: Though the El Reno tornado officially ranks as the widest on record, Doppler on Wheels measurements of the 1999 Mulhall, Oklahoma tornado indicated that it may have been 4.3 mi (6.9 km) wide. The 1946 Timber Lake, South Dakota tornado was documented by the United States Weather Bureau to have been 4 mi (6.4 km) wide, but it occurred outside the National Weather Service's timeframe for "reliable records", which started in 1950.) At 6:28 p.m. CDT (23:28 UTC), the storm began moving into more densely populated areas of Canadian County while maintaining its intensity. This prompted the National Weather Service office in Norman to issue a tornado emergency for Yukon, Richland, Wiley Post Airport, Bethany, The Village, and eastern El Reno, as the tornado was projected to track toward western portions of the Oklahoma City metropolitan area. Within minutes, the tornado turned northeast and soon passed directly over Interstate 40 at around 6:42 p.m. CDT (23:42 UTC), killing two people in a minivan that was thrown as a result of the tornado. Shortly thereafter, the tornado lifted off the ground as it neared Banner Road. Overall, the tornado was on the ground for 40 minutes along a 16.2-mile (26.1 km) path.

A strong anticyclonic multi-vortex satellite tornado also formed southeast of the primary tornado at approximately 6:28 pm CDT (23:28 UTC), and remained on the ground for 15 minutes before lifting at 6:43 p.m. (23:43 UTC). Such companion tornadoes tend to be observed with especially large and intense tornadoes, although this was the first documented multiple-vortex anticyclonic tornado of this kind.

=== Intensity ===
Video of several sub-vortices within the tornado.

The intensity of the tornado has been a subject of internal debate within the National Oceanic and Atmospheric Administration. The agency uses the Enhanced Fujita Scale to rate and assess tornado intensity based on the damage left behind. This excludes the use of supplementary measurements, such as those from mobile radar, in concluding a tornado's intensity. Initially receiving an official EF3 rating based on damage, the El Reno tornado was subsequently upgraded to a radar-estimated EF5 rating, the highest on the scale, based on data from a mobile radar. The University of Oklahoma's RaXPol mobile Doppler weather radar, positioned at a nearby overpass, measured winds preliminarily analyzed as in excess of 296 mph (476 km/h). These winds are considered the second-highest ever measured worldwide, just shy of the 321 mph (517 km/h) recorded during the 1999 Bridge Creek–Moore tornado.

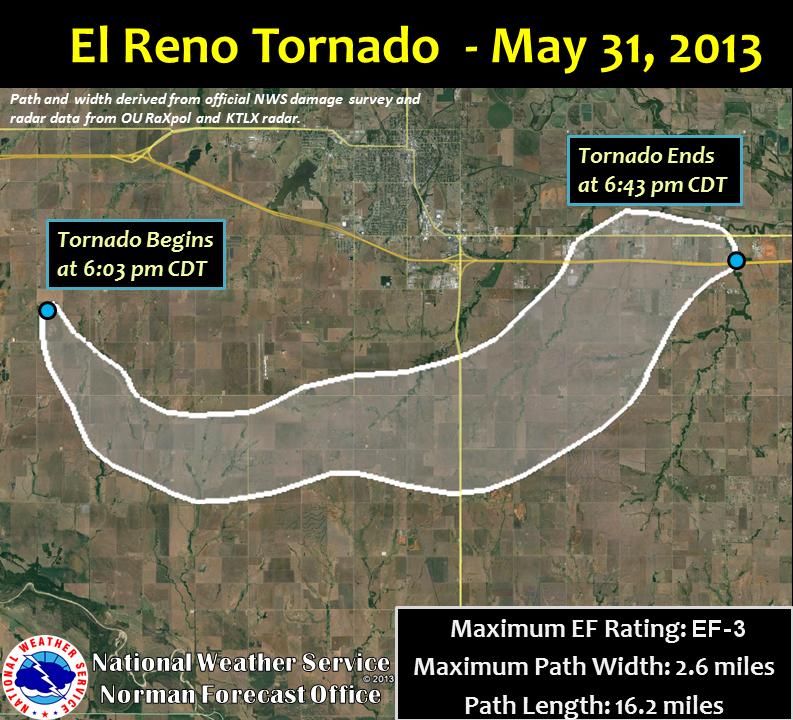

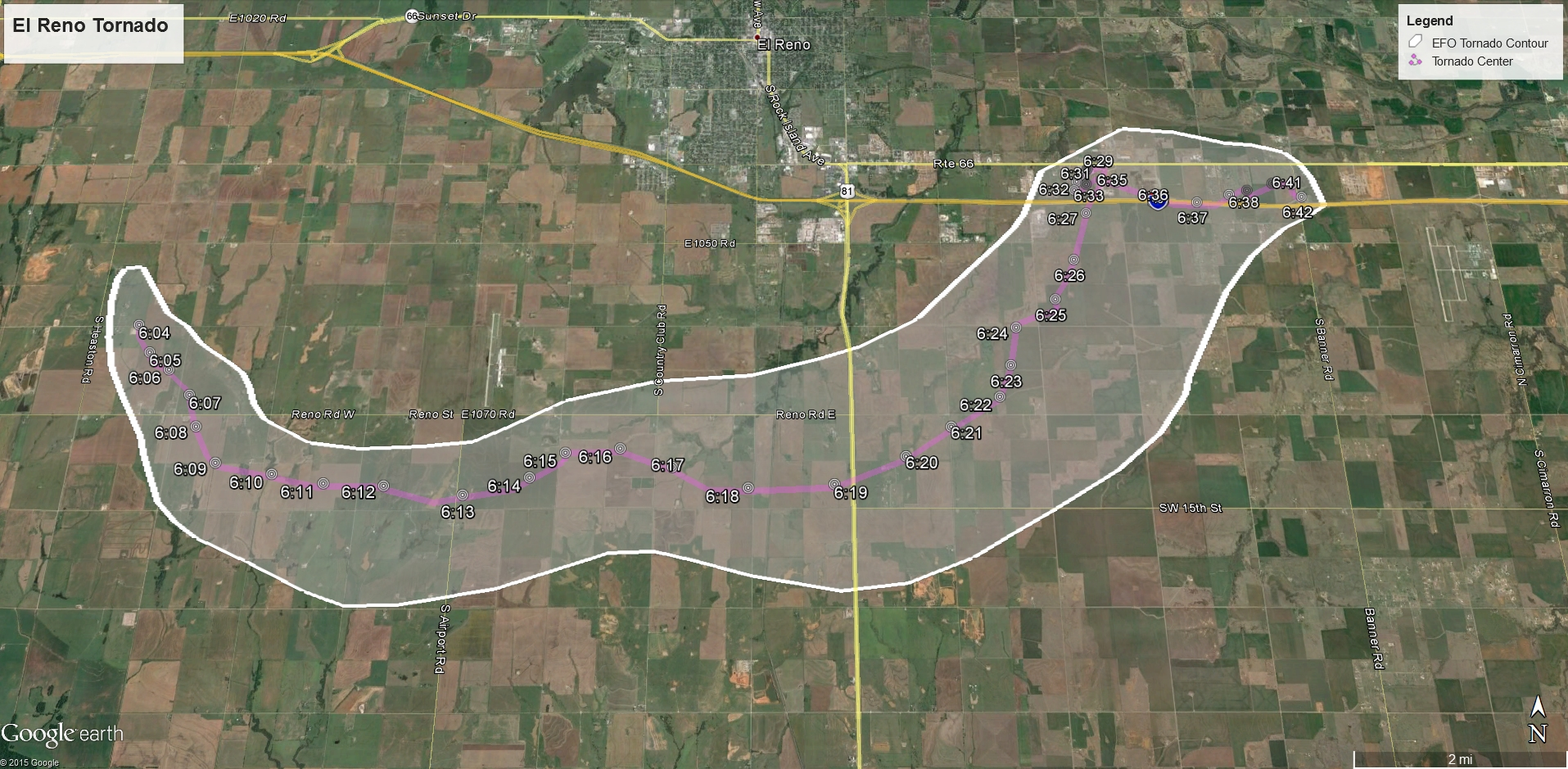
A minute-by-minute timeline of the tornado's position.

Revised RaXPol analysis found winds of 302 ± 34 mph (486 ± 55 km/h) well above ground level and ≥291 mph (468 km/h) below 10 m (33 ft), with some subvortices moving at 175 mph (282 km/h). The strongest winds occurred in small subvortices along the south side of the main vortex. The two most intense vortices occurred north and east of the intersection of 10th Street and Radio Road, about 3 miles (4.8 km) southeast of El Reno. The main funnel is believed to have had radar-estimated EF4 winds, with wind speeds around 185 mph (298 km/h). Radar-estimated EF5 winds were only found aloft and in the smaller vortices that revolved around this funnel at 110 mph (180 km/h). A revised analysis in 2015 revealed a peak wind of 313 mph (504 km/h). In March 2024, NOAA and OU published a new analysis, which estimated that winds may have reached up to anywhere between 115–150 m/s (257–336 mph; 414–540 km/h).

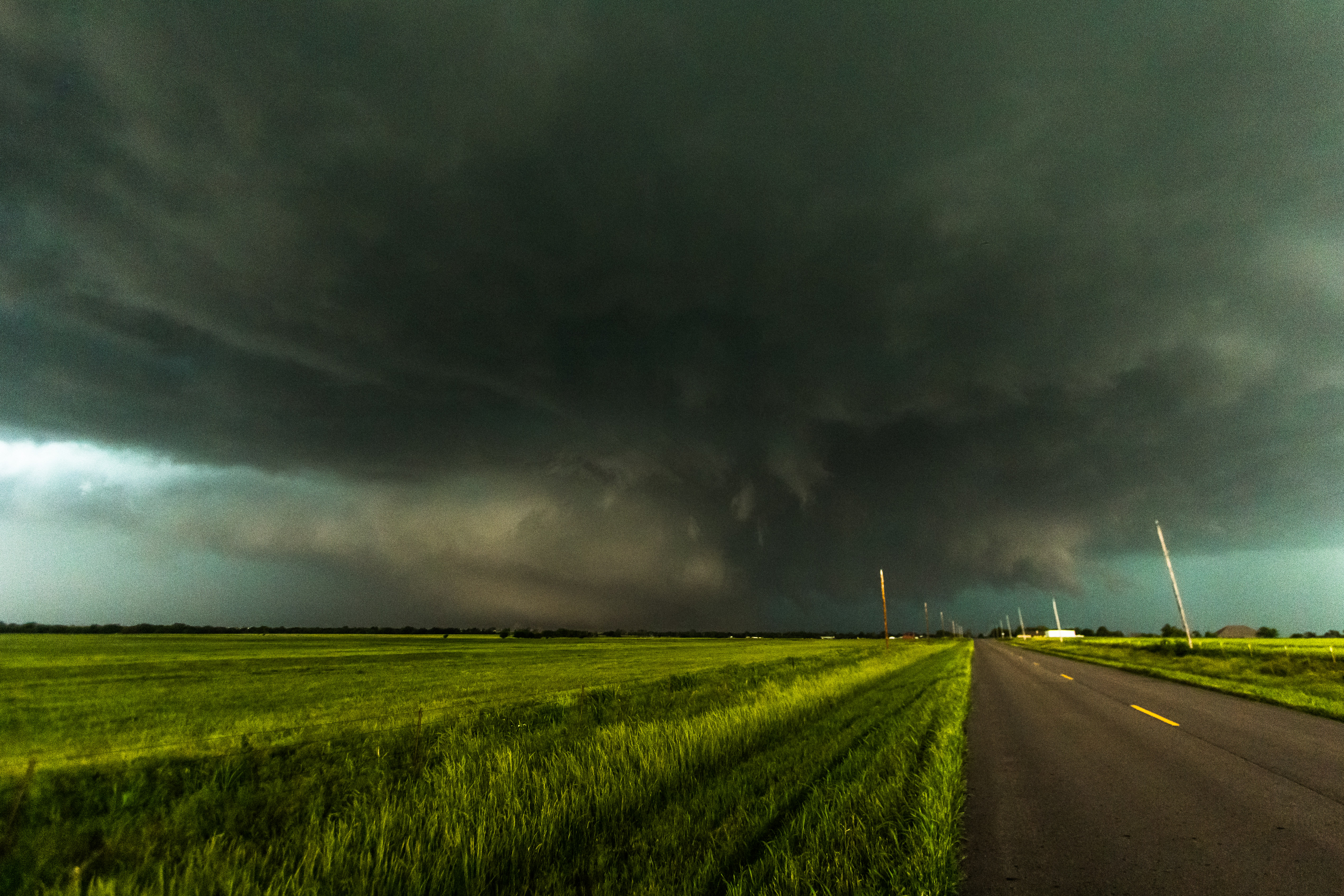
The tornado at around peak intensity as seen from north of Banner Rd and 15th Street

Rick Smith, the warning coordination meteorologist at the National Weather Service Weather Forecast Office in Norman, stated that this tornado was among a "super-rare" category within the EF5 rating. Smith also stated that it was fortunate the tornado did not track into more densely populated areas, particularly those within the Oklahoma City metropolitan area, "this would have been ... I don't even want to imagine what it would have been." William Hooke, a senior policy fellow at the American Meteorological Society stated that, "[Oklahoma City] dodged a bullet...You lay that path over Oklahoma City, and you have devastation of biblical proportions."

On August 30, 2013, the National Weather Service office in Norman once again revised the intensity of the El Reno tornado. Keli Pirtle, a Public Affairs worker at the National Oceanic and Atmospheric Administration, stated that, "despite the radar-measured wind speeds, the survey team did not find damage that would support a rating higher than EF3. While the wind measurements from the mobile radars are considered reliable, NWS policy for determining EF-ratings is based on surveys of ground damage." The lack of EF5 damage was likely a result of the rural nature of the area, as the sub-vortices that contained the EF5 wind speeds did not impact any structures.

== Storm chaser incidents ==
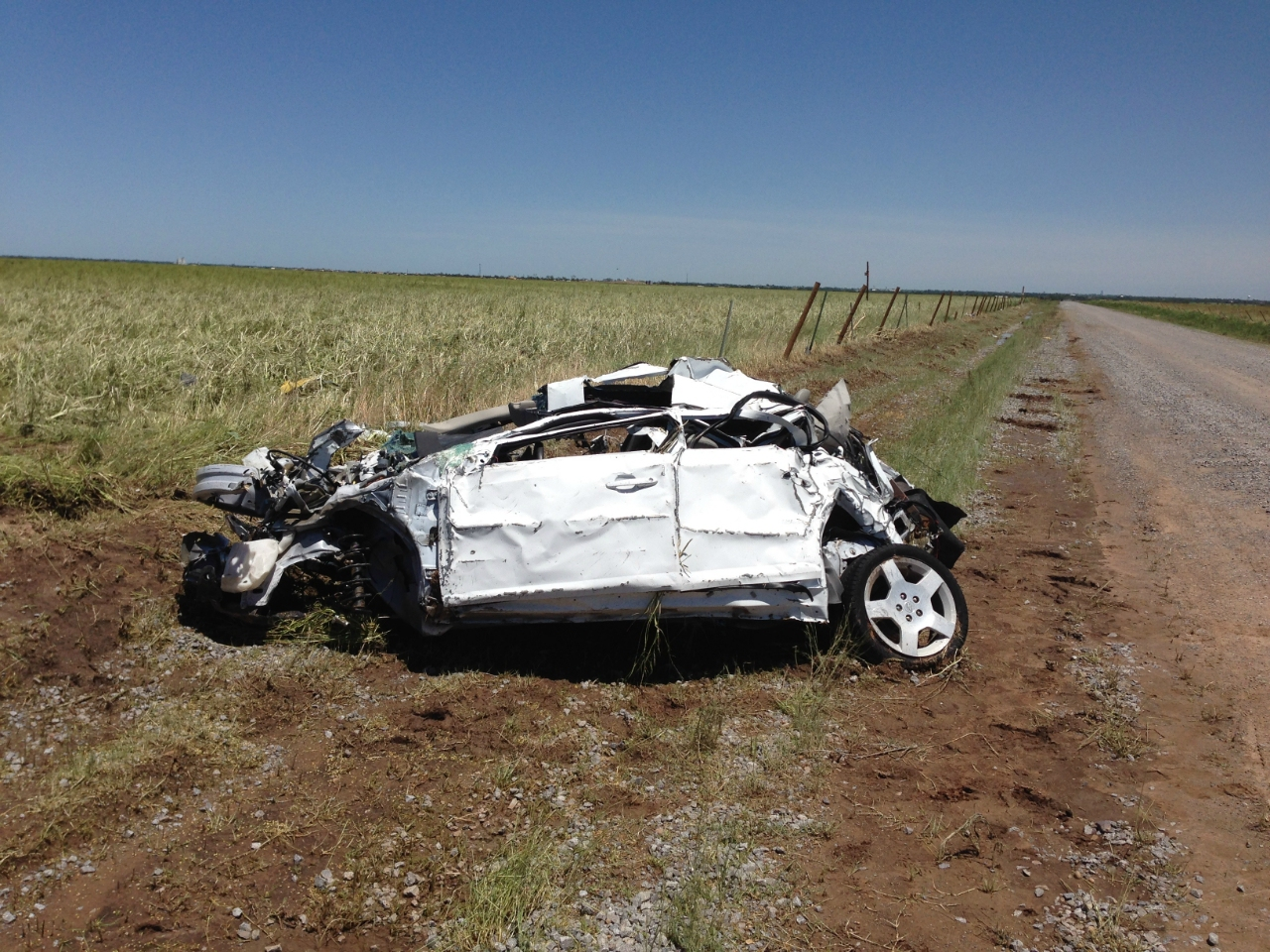
The crushed remains of the TWISTEX Chevrolet Cobalt near the intersection of Reuter and South Radio Roads, almost 5 mi (8.0 km) southeast of El Reno.

The tornado's unusual behavior consisted of several simultaneous occurrences: abrupt changes in direction, rapid enlargement to a width of 2.6 mi (4.2 km) in diameter in about 30 seconds, swift increase in forward motion from about 20 to 55 mph (32 to 89 km/h) within a few minutes, multiple vortices within and around, and an expansive translucent outer circulation without a full condensation funnel while being surrounded and obscured by precipitation made it a worst-case scenario for storm chasers. Several professional and amateur chasers were caught off guard and impacted by the tornado. Many were located in a region northeast of the tornado, known as the "bear's cage". Chasers can generally get a clear view of the tornado from that area; however, it places them at great risk and with little time to react should the storm take a left turn.

In the case of El Reno, the wrapping rain bands did not lead to a narrow corridor of clear air close to the tornado. Rather, these rotating curtains of rain were the outer circulation of the tornado itself. Former Discovery Channel storm chaser Tim Samaras (an engineer), his son Paul Samaras (a photographer), and Tim's longtime chase partner Carl Young (a meteorologist), all professional storm chasers with the TWISTEX project, were caught directly by the tornado; all three died in their vehicle, two of them were ejected. Normally, Tim drove a reinforced three-quarter ton truck optimized for hail protection and stability in high winds; however, Carl was driving an unmodified Chevrolet Cobalt, a subcompact vehicle with three 45-lb barometric probes in the trunk likened by one TWISTEX chaser to a "pizza delivery car", making it much less suited to high winds and rain-slicked backcountry dirt roads. It was also underpowered, which hampered their escape in the strong inflow winds. Tim's body was found still buckled in the passenger's seat. They were the first known tornado-related deaths of either recreational storm chasers or scientific researchers.

Mike Bettes, a meteorologist for The Weather Channel, was also caught in the storm. His sport utility vehicle was severely damaged, having been thrown about 200 yards (180 m); the driver was left with a broken neck, fractured vertebrae, and several broken ribs while Bettes and the other passenger sustained minor injuries. Meteorologist Emily Sutton and storm chaser Kevin Josefy of Oklahoma City NBC affiliate KFOR-TV (channel 4) were also caught in the path of the storm; their vehicle was damaged by debris hurled by the tornado. University of Oklahoma student Billy Prater, along with his father and a friend, sought refuge under an overpass (an action strongly discouraged in these situations) when the tornado changed direction. Near Union City, debris from a barn destroyed by the tornado struck the vehicle of Brandon Sullivan and Brett Wright, breaking their windshield; they escaped without injury. The hood of Reed Timmer's Dominator 2, a vehicle designed for intercepting tornadoes, was torn off by lines that were down from the tornado. Storm chaser Dan Robinson received injuries after being enveloped within the outskirts of the tornadic circulation. He escaped a few hundred meters ahead of the TWISTEX crew on Reuter Road. Just behind the TWISTEX crew, a tour group led by storm chasers Randy Walton and Mike Phelps followed immediately behind both TWISTEX and Robinson's vehicles on Reuter Road, however the group turned around just as the tornado began crossing the road ahead and escaped without being impacted.

A Doppler on Wheels-based analysis of how the tornado impacted these teams revealed that they were hit by an intense internal sub-vortex. This analysis showed that both the Weather Channel and TWISTEX vehicles entered the tornado through the less intense north/northwestern side, then were impacted by the internal sub-vortex, which contained radar-indicated winds approaching 200 miles per hour (320 km/h) and was moving in a complex quasi-trochoidal pattern, sometimes nearly stationary, sometimes with forward speeds over 100 miles per hour (160 km/h). Entering the larger tornadic circulation without the ability to maintain situational awareness of the internal sub-vortex was likely a key contributing factor to the deaths and injuries.

=== Response ===
Storm spotter tribute to Tim Samaras, Paul Samaras, and Carl Young across the Plains on June 2.

In the wake of the storm chaser deaths, Kansas Emergency Management Association president Brian Stone called for there to be regulations put on future storm chasing; however, he stated that there are questions as to how it would actually be implemented. AccuWeather Senior Vice President Mike Smith urged against overreacting to their deaths, citing that they were the first chasers to be killed in 40 years of the practice and that chasing as a whole is a significant source of real-time and research information.

On June 2, dozens of members of the storm chasing and spotting communities coordinated a tribute to Tim Samaras, Paul Samaras, and Carl Young. Using GPS transponders over Spotter Network, they aligned themselves to spell out the initials of the three men in North Dakota, South Dakota and Nebraska for many hours. The Discovery Channel scheduled a special tribute episode of Storm Chasers titled Mile Wide Tornado: Oklahoma Disaster on June 5, both honoring the three chasers and covering the events of the EF5-rated tornado that struck Moore and portions of southern Oklahoma City eleven days earlier on May 20. The November 2013 issue of National Geographic, for its featured cover story, paid tribute to Tim Samaras, a National Geographic Explorer funded in part by the Society, and featured a detailed scientific analysis of the tornado itself.

A team of scientists and veteran chasers embarked on a crowd-sourcing survey project to gather storm chaser information, including video and photographic recordings and GPS logs, to piece together precisely what happened. It was the largest such visual data set ever collected on a tornado. The chaser information is compiled with radar and lightning data and the project is intended to eventually expand to a standardized open access database covering future events. In association with the project, software was unveiled in 2015 allowing for the synchronization of maps, radar data, and storm chasers' footage of the storm. The tool was named "Tornado Environment Display" (TED) after Dr. Ted Fujita. Anton Seimon, one of the tool's architects, said that while the tool had only been used in relation to the El Reno tornado, it could potentially be applied to future tornadoes with sufficient footage as well.

== Casualties and impact ==
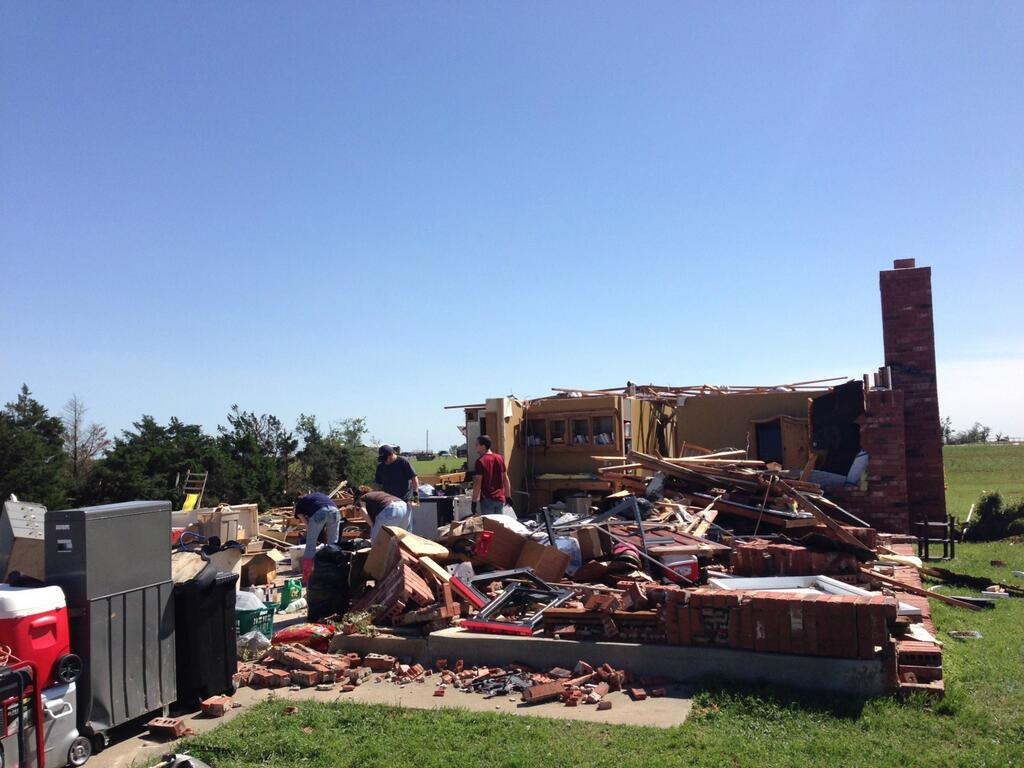
A destroyed home about 4 miles (6.4 km) west of U.S. Route 81.

Since the tornado remained over mostly open terrain, damage was relatively light—although still significant in isolated locations—in comparison to its extreme intensity. Surveys from the National Weather Service revealed that structures in its path sustained EF3-level damage at most. The Oklahoma City West Livestock Market was described as a "war zone", sustaining extensive damage. Several large steel-frame warehouse type buildings were destroyed at that location. Multiple large brick buildings at the nearby Canadian Valley Technology Center were heavily damaged or destroyed, and a large metal wind turbine prop blade was thrown 100 yards (91 m) into the side of a daycare building on the property. Damage totals at that location alone were estimated at up to $40 million. One farmstead, consisting of a large barn, a cattle barn, three machine sheds, granaries and the owner's home, was also completely destroyed. Several other rural homes were destroyed, and large amounts of gravel was blown off of gravel roads in the area, with only the dirt underneath left at some locations. Several large metal electrical transmission poles were downed, trees were snapped and defoliated, and multiple vehicles were tossed from roadways in the area. At least 29 buildings and 40 vehicles were damaged or destroyed by the tornado, with repairs in the El Reno area expected to take at least a year.

On June 1, the American Red Cross set up a shelter at the Redlands Community College in El Reno for victims of the storm. The following day, Oklahoma Governor Mary Fallin toured damaged areas of El Reno. Due to the tornadoes that occurred previously on May 20, a state of emergency was already in place for the affected areas, allowing residents to quickly obtain emergency assistance. Residents left homeless were provided with temporary housing constructed from shipping containers. Each container was fitted with a kitchen, bedroom, living room, and bathroom.

Overall, eight people lost their lives as a result of the tornado, all of whom were killed in vehicles. Local hospitals in Oklahoma City, including OU Medical Center and INTEGRIS Southwest Medical Center, and Mercy Hospital in El Reno, reported receiving at least 115 injured, including five critical patients. Overall, 151 injuries were attributed to the tornado.

=== Evacuations ===
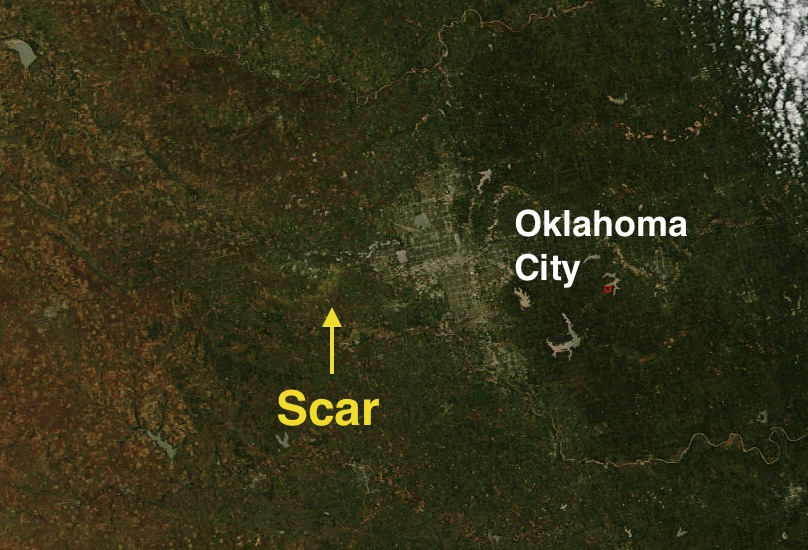
Satellite image of the Oklahoma City area on June 2 displaying the ground scar left behind by the tornado.

As the tornadoes approached the Oklahoma City metro, thousands of residents decided to leave the area for safety, possibly due to the still fresh memories of the devastation caused by the EF5 tornado that struck Moore on May 20. Already congested with rush hour traffic, Interstates 35, 40, 44 and 240, became "parking lots" as the storms neared. Residents reported the highways to be a scene of chaos, "people were going southbound in the northbound lanes. Everybody was running for their lives." It has been suggested that the evacuation was partially caused by a controversial call to action on-air by KFOR-TV chief meteorologist Mike Morgan, who suggested on-air during coverage of the storm—as the tornado was projected to track into Oklahoma City—that residents without underground storm shelters or safe rooms get into their cars and evacuate south of the track. This advice was contrary to the recommended plan to go to an interior room, bathtub or closet with no windows if no basement or other underground shelter is available. These locations are typically much safer than an automobile in tornadic winds. Dr. Jeff Masters of Weather Underground stated that had the tornado tracked directly over one of the congested highways, the death toll could have easily exceeded 500.

== See also ==
- Tornado outbreak sequence of May 21–26, 2011
- 2004 Hallam tornado – An enormous F4 tornado in southeast Nebraska, which previously was the largest U.S. tornado on record
- 2013 Moore tornado – A destructive EF5 tornado across the Oklahoma City metropolitan area just 11 days earlier
- 2011 El Reno–Piedmont tornado – An extremely violent EF5 tornado that impacted areas near El Reno about two years prior
- 2020 Bassfield–Soso tornado – Another extremely large, rainwrapped and violent EF4 tornado in southeast Mississippi, ranked as the third widest U.S. tornado ever recorded
- List of tornadoes with confirmed satellite tornadoes
- Tornado records
