= Reno Township =

Reno Township may refer to:

- Reno Township, Leavenworth County, Kansas, in Leavenworth County, Kansas
- Reno Township, Reno County, Kansas, in Reno County, Kansas
- Reno Township, Michigan
- Reno Township, Pope County, Minnesota
