= Reno Lake =

Lake in the state of Minnesota, United States

- Location within Minnesota
- Location: Crow Wing County, Minnesota
- Coordinates: 46.4678246°N 93.8961016°W
- Type: lake

Reno Lake is a lake in Crow Wing County, in the U.S. state of Minnesota.

Reno Lake was named for Jesse L. Reno, a United States Army officer killed in the Civil War.

== See also ==
- List of lakes in Minnesota
