= Carl Young (storm chaser) =

American meteorologist (1968–2013)

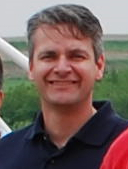
- Young in 2009
- Born: Carl Richard Young; May 14, 1968; Oakland, California, U.S.
- Died: May 31, 2013 (aged 45); Canadian County, Oklahoma, U.S.
- Cause of death: Tornado incident, ejected from the car
- Known for: Tornado field research
- Scientific career
- Fields: Engineering, meteorology

Carl Richard Young (May 14, 1968 – May 31, 2013) was an American meteorologist and storm chaser who worked with the TWISTEX research team. He was one of the first storm chasers in the United States to die during a tornado; he was killed during the 2013 El Reno tornado, alongside Tim Samaras and Paul Samaras.

== Life ==
Young was born in Oakland, California, on May 14, 1968. He graduated from Carmel High School and received a bachelor's degree from the University of California, Berkeley, in the field of economics. Young also received a master's degree in atmospheric science at the University of Nevada, Reno. Carl was married only once in his life to Dilara Esengil. They met in Berkeley were married in 1993 to 1999. They remained in contact throughout his life. He began storm chasing in 2000 following work on Hollywood film sets. At ChaserCon in 2002, Young met Tim Samaras; the pair would go on several storm chases together, seeing a total of over 125 tornadoes. In 2012, Young helped film the documentary series Storm Chasers, which aired on the Discovery Channel. In early 2013, Young promised to Dalia Terleckaite, who was his girlfriend at the time, that he would cease chasing, although Young continued to chase storms. Prior to his death, Young also helped write Monthly Weather Review publications with the TWISTEX team.

== El Reno tornado and death ==
In the spring of 2013, TWISTEX was conducting lightning research (including with a high-speed camera) when active tornadic periods ensued in mid to late May. Young drove a Chevrolet Cobalt to the Oklahoma City area along with Tim and Paul Samaras.

At 6:23 p.m. on May 31, 2013, three members of the group were killed by a violent tornado with wind speeds estimated to have been in excess of 295 mph (475 km/h) near the Regional Airport of El Reno, Oklahoma. The TWISTEX vehicle was struck and thrown by a subvortex, which generate the highest winds; some of these were moving at 175 mph (282 km/h) within the parent tornado. Shortly before they were killed, Young noted how there was no rain around the vehicle as the wind grew "eerily calm". Tim Samaras responded: "Actually, I think we're in a bad spot."

The tornado was sampled by University of Oklahoma RaXPol radar as 2.6 miles (4.2 km) wide, the widest tornado ever recorded. The true size of the multiple-vortex tornado confused onlookers by its mammoth proportions containing orbiting subvortices larger than average tornadoes and its expansive transparent to translucent outer circulation. The strong inflow and outer-circulation winds in conjunction with rocky roads and a relatively underpowered vehicle also hampered driving away from the tornado. The tornado simultaneously took an unexpected sharp turn, closing on their position as it rapidly accelerated within a few minutes from about 20 mph (32 km/h) to as much as 60 mph (97 km/h) in forward movement and swiftly expanded from about 1 mile (1.6 km) to 2.6 miles (4.2 km) wide in about 30 seconds, and was mostly obscured in heavy precipitation, all of which combined so that several other chasers were also hit or had near misses. It was the first known instance of a storm chaser or a meteorologist killed by a tornado. Young's body was found 0.5 miles (0.80 km) away from the vehicle.

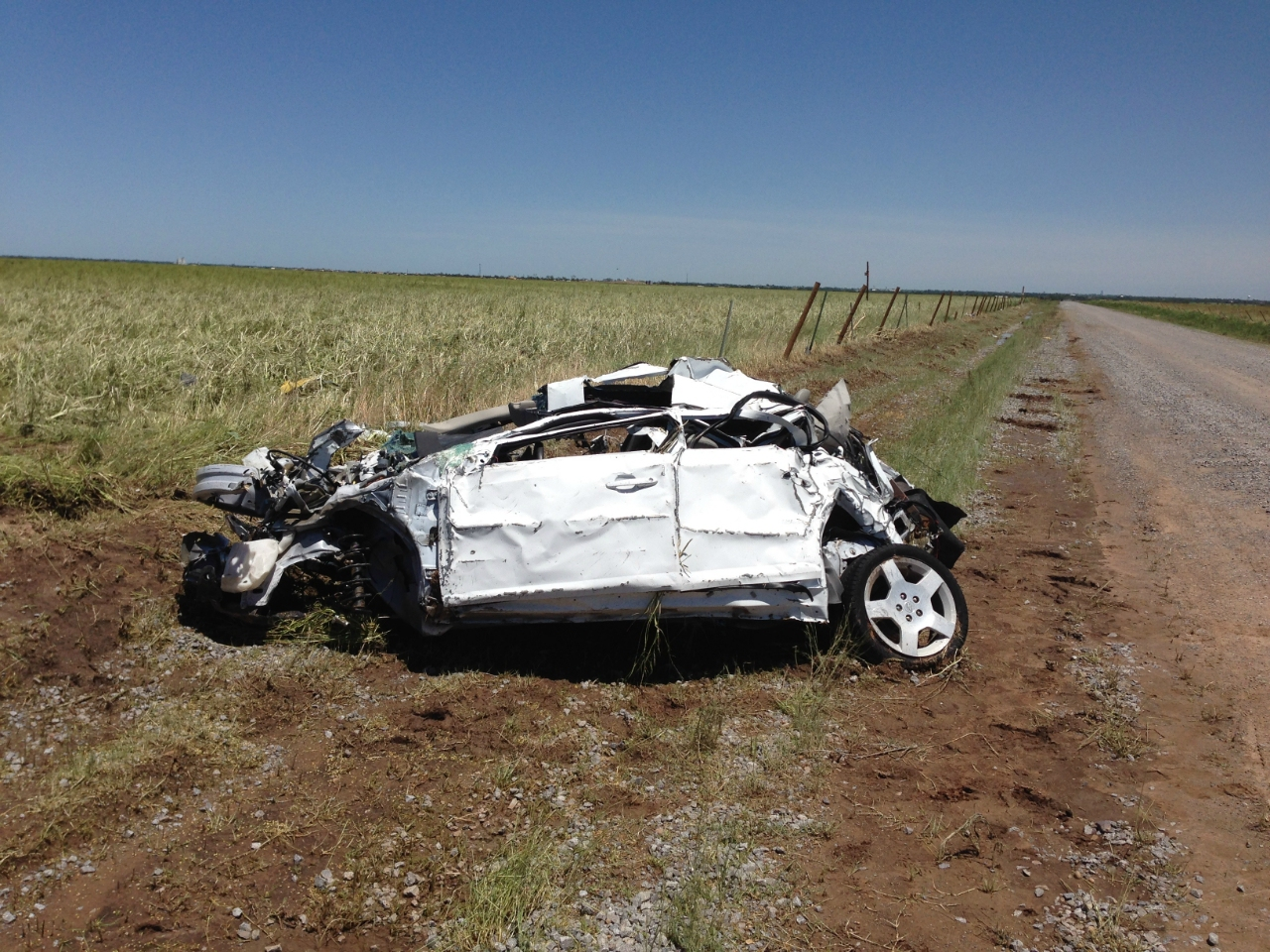
Remains of the vehicle Young was traveling in, located near El Reno, Oklahoma.

Even before it was known that Young and the two other passengers had been killed, the event led many to question storm-chasing tactics, particularly in close proximity to tornadoes. In addition to the three TWISTEX members, the tornado killed five other people, including local resident Richard Charles Henderson, who had decided to follow the storm.

Atmospheric scientists and storm chasers embarked on a major project to gather information and analyze what happened regarding chaser actions and meteorological occurrences. A makeshift memorial was established at the site soon after the incident and a crowdfunded permanent memorial, spearheaded by Doug Gerten, the deputy who first found the vehicle wreckage, was later established, although it was vandalized in late March 2016, with the monument struck by bullets and the American flag cut away from the flagpole.

== See also ==
- Deaths in May 2013
