= National Weather Service Norman, Oklahoma =

Weather Forecast Office of the National Weather Service

National Weather Service Weather Forecast Office Norman, Oklahoma

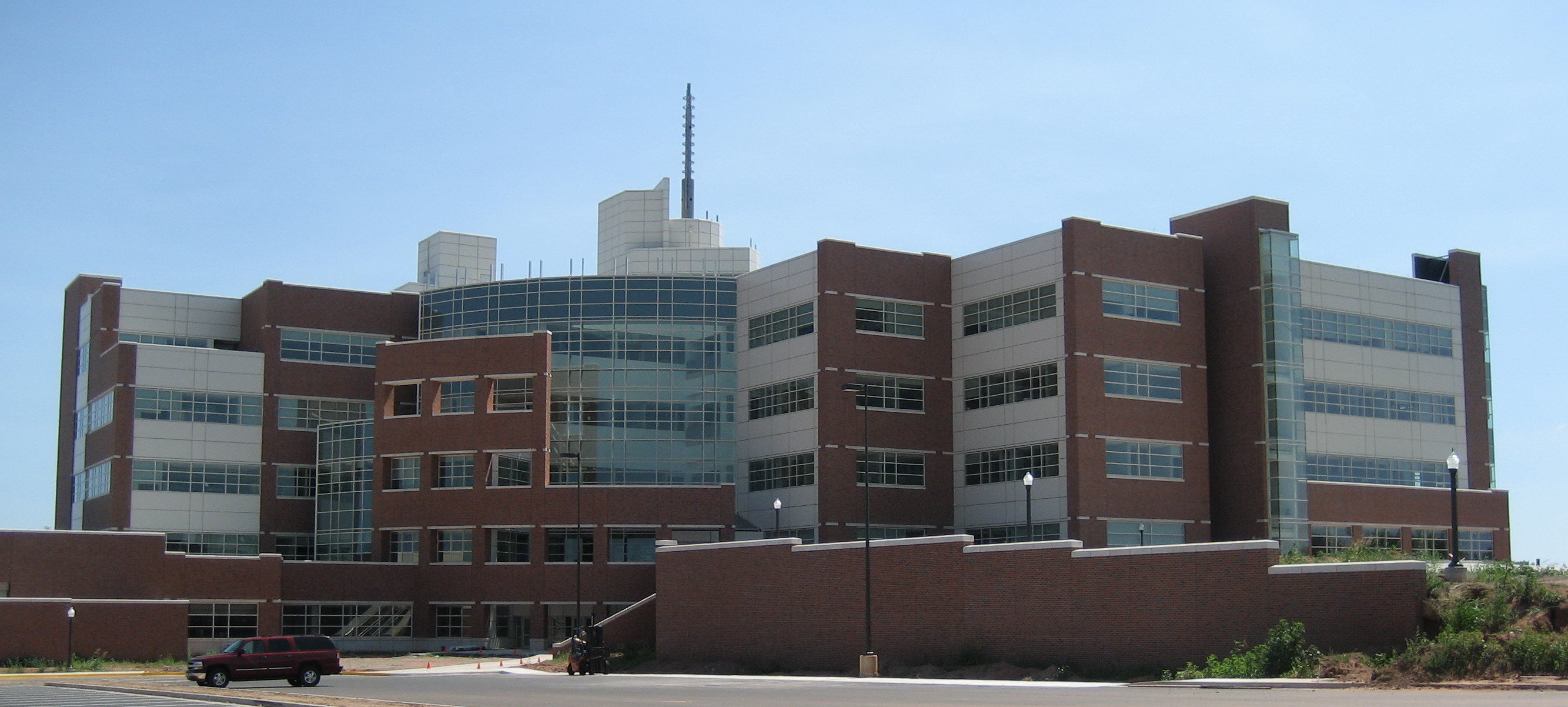
- The National Weather Center complex, which has housed the NWS Norman office since the facility opened in 2006.

Agency overview
- Formed: November 1, 1890
- Preceding agencies: National Weather Service Oklahoma City, Oklahoma; Weather Bureau Oklahoma City, Oklahoma
- Jurisdiction: Federal Government of the United States
- Headquarters: 120 David L Boren Blvd, Norman, Oklahoma 73072; 35°10′55″N 97°26′24″W
- Employees: 25
- Agency executives: Mark Fox, Meteorologist in Charge; Rick Smith, Warning Coordination Meteorologist
- Parent agency: National Weather Service (operating as a branch of the NWS Southern Region Headquarters)
- Website: www.weather.gov/oun

National Weather Service - Norman, Oklahoma (office identification code: OUN) is a Weather Forecast Office (WFO) of the National Weather Service based in Norman, Oklahoma, which is responsible for forecasts and the dissemination of weather warnings and advisories for central and most of western Oklahoma (with the exception of the panhandle), and western portions of north Texas. It is located in the National Weather Center on the University of Oklahoma campus, where it acts as one of the NOAA Weather Partners, a group of close-together weather-related agencies of the National Oceanic and Atmospheric Administration. NWS Norman is currently overseen by Mark Fox, who serves as the Meteorologist In Charge of the office.

The Norman Weather Forecast Office – which operates as a branch of the National Weather Service's Southern Region Headquarters (SRH) division – manages three NEXRAD (WSR-88D) Doppler weather radar sites that cover its area of forecasting responsibility, based in Oklahoma City (radar identification code: TLX), serving central Oklahoma; Frederick (FDR), serving southwestern Oklahoma and western north Texas; and at Vance Air Force Base (VNX), serving north-central and northwestern parts of Oklahoma, and portions of southern Kansas. The office has earned widespread recognition from local media outlets, especially in concern with certain weather conditions that are or are forecast to occur. It has also received attention from national media, and was even recognized by United States president Barack Obama.

== History ==
=== Location ===
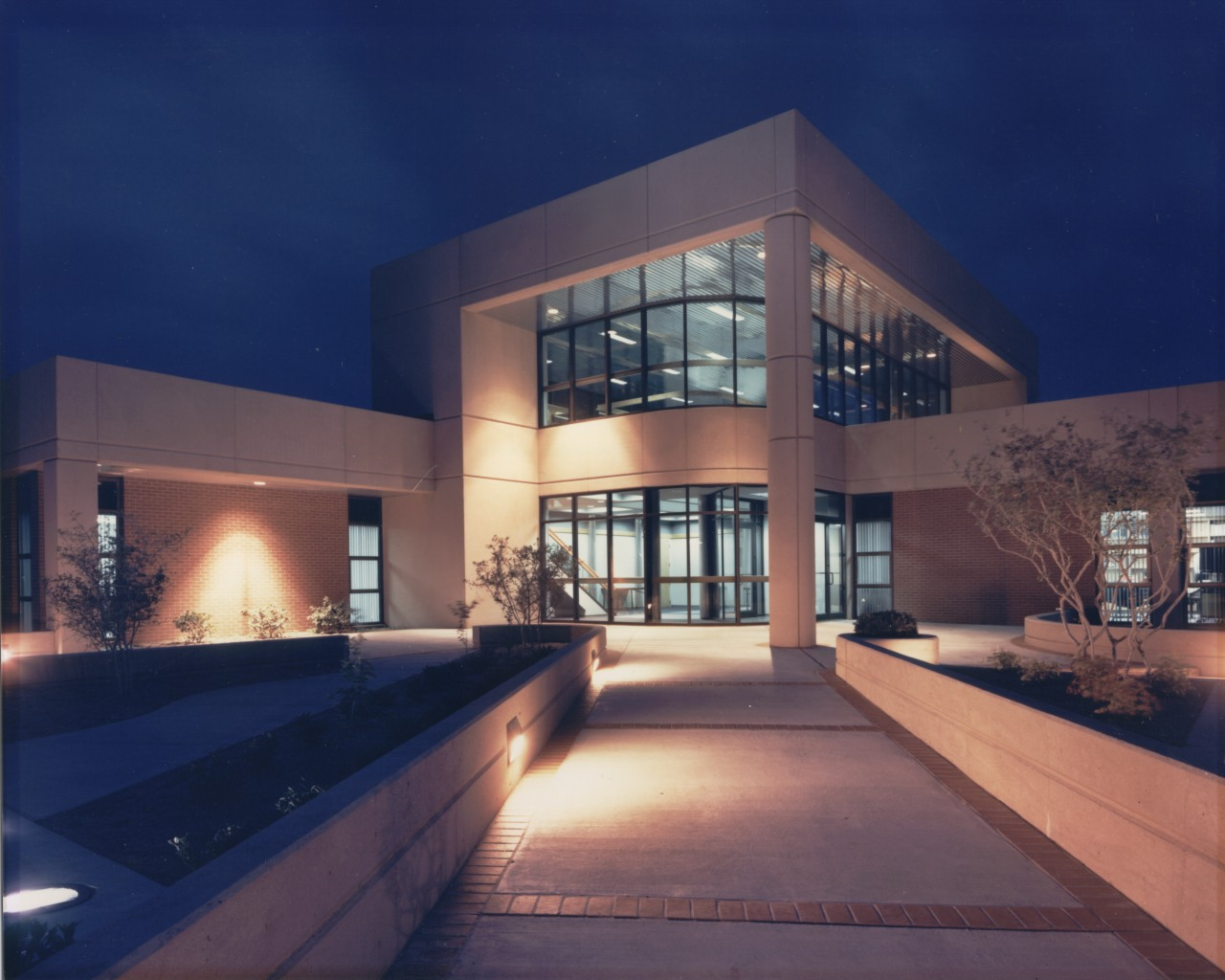
Former office of NWS Norman located near Max Westheimer Airport, where it was based from 1987 to 2006.

The U.S. Weather Bureau created the Central Oklahoma forecast office on November 1, 1890; it was originally based in Oklahoma City at the Overholser Opera House, on the southeast corner of Robinson Avenue and Grand Boulevard in the city's downtown district. Twelve years later, the Weather Bureau relocated the Oklahoma City office's operations to the Culbertson Building, at the southeast corner of Grand and Broadway Avenue, where it began operating from on July 1, 1902. (The former location at the Overholser Opera House was eventually demolished in 1964; the Myriad Convention Center was later built on the property, where it remains to this day, having since been repurposed as the film production facility Prairie Surf Studios.)

The offices at the Culbertson Building was closed four years later on January 16, 1906, with the operations moving once again, this time to a newly constructed weather observatory located at 1923 Classen Boulevard in northwest Oklahoma City. In 1932, the office began to slowly migrate its forecasting operations and other functions from the observatory to a new Weather Bureau office based in an existing building at Will Rogers Airport on the city's southwestern edge, which opened on April 2 of that year. Eventually, an actual proprietary building to solely house the Weather Bureau office was constructed at the airport, where it moved on October 22, 1965. Shortly afterward, the U.S. Weather Bureau was renamed the National Weather Service (NWS). On January 27, 1987, the National Weather Service moved its central Oklahoma office away from Oklahoma City (and Oklahoma County), and relocated its operations into a building that had been constructed specifically for NWS use in Cleveland County, at Max Westheimer Airport (now the University of Oklahoma Westheimer Airport) in Norman.

The National Severe Storms Laboratory (NSSL) followed the central Oklahoma office there in 1990. Then, in October 1995, the National Severe Storms Forecast Center – was subsequently renamed the Storm Prediction Center (SPC) – migrated its operations from Kansas City, Missouri to a wing of the Max Westheimer Airport campus. On August 7, 2006, the National Weather Service office, the Storm Prediction Center and the National Severe Storms Laboratory began moving their respective operations into the newly constructed National Weather Center building on the southern portion of the University of Oklahoma's Research Campus.

=== Weather forecasting ===
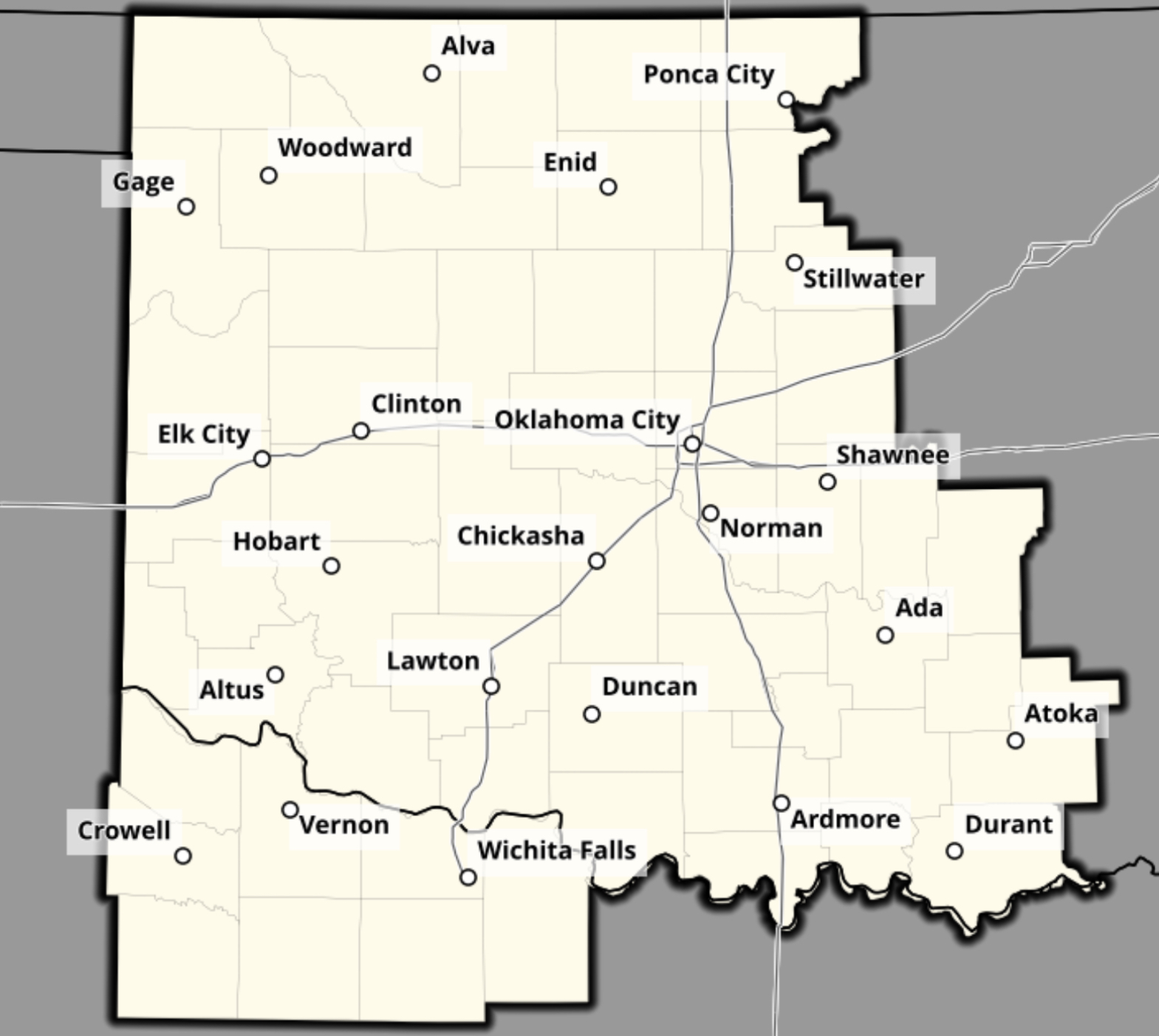
The forecasting and warning area for the National Weather Service office in Norman, Oklahoma

The Norman Weather Forecast Office handles responsibility for the general forecasting and the issuance of watches, warnings and advisories for hazardous weather conditions for 48 counties in Oklahoma and eight counties in western north Texas (with major cities served by the office including Oklahoma City, Lawton, Enid and Wichita Falls). Though, as the Storm Prediction Center is responsible for issuing severe thunderstorm and tornado watches, the Norman WFO only composes outline and status updates for SPC-issued watches affecting any portion of its designated County Warning Area.

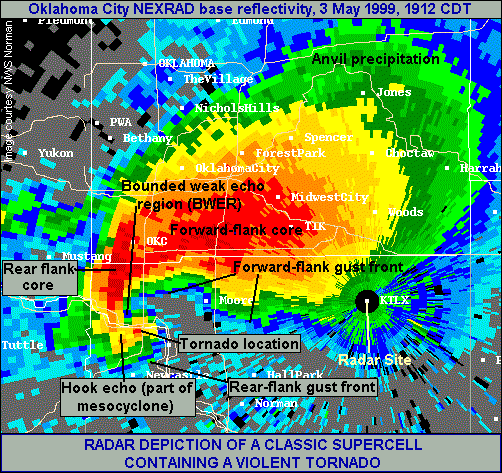
Radar base reflectivity of the first supercell thunderstorm to form during the May 3, 1999 tornado outbreak; at the time of this imagery, the supercell – which carries the distinct, "classic" appearance, including a prominent hook echo – had produced a violent tornado near Bridge Creek as it was approaching Moore. The tornado did not dissipate until 7:48 p.m. Central Time that evening as it was moving through southeastern Oklahoma City.

Under NOAA operational guidelines for such situations, responsibility over the issuance of forecasts – both routine and short-term – and weather alert products can be transferred to the National Weather Service office in Tulsa in the event of an outage (such as a computer system failure or building-wide power disruption) or an emergency necessitating the enactment of evacuation procedures for NWS and guidance center personnel (such as an approaching strong tornadic circulation or tornado on the ground) that affects the Norman campus. (Prior to this plan of action being implemented, the NWS would also authorize local media to take over warning responsibilities. One notable instance in which such a situation occurred was on June 8, 1974, when a gas line rupture caused by an F3 tornado that touched down just southwest of the former Will Rogers Airport office – the first of 22 that hit Oklahoma and of five that affected the Oklahoma City area on that date, taking an 8.9-mile [14.3 km] northeastward track across the city – forced NWS officials to evacuate the building until the line was repaired; this resulted in NWS officials requesting to NBC affiliate WKY-TV's [channel 4, now KFOR-TV] chief meteorologist at the time, Jim Williams, to temporarily assume responsibility for issuing warnings on the unfolding outbreak until the office could resume operations.)

The forecast office has been responsible for advance warning dissemination and short-term forecasting during many severe weather and winter weather events that have happened within the County Warning Area, including notable tornado outbreaks and other significant weather events that the Norman office's area of responsibility has been the site of.

During the first week of May 1999, a major tornado outbreak affected portions of the Central and Southeastern United States, with the most severe activity impacting much of Oklahoma – especially locations within the Norman County Warning Area – on the late-afternoon and evening of May 3. The ninth tornado produced by the first supercell was the most significant, becoming the first tornado recorded to have produced damage costs surpassing US$1 billion. This tornado affected much of the southern portion of the Oklahoma City metropolitan area, and as it progressed over Bridge Creek in northeastern Grady County, a mobile Doppler on Wheels radar recorded maximum wind speeds within the tornado at upper elevations at 301 ± 20 mph (484 ± 32 km/h), among the highest winds known to have ever been observed on or near the Earth's surface.

At 6:57 p.m. Central Time that evening, as the tornado tracked near Newcastle, the Norman office disseminated the first tornado emergency ever issued by the National Weather Service for Moore and southern Oklahoma City; the enhanced warning statement – which in its initial version, was issued as a separate Severe Weather Statement, and is now incorporated within a newly issued or a Special Weather Statement on an existing tornado warning to denote a damaging tornado affecting densely populated areas – was drafted by staff meteorologist David Andra (who would later be appointed Meteorologist in Charge of the Norman office in 2012), in order to convey to the public and local media outlets the heightened danger and imminent impact of the destructive tornado.

== Websites ==
The National Weather Service Weather Forecast Office in Norman maintains a multitude of websites available to the public, which provide weather information for the Norman forecast area of responsibility. The Norman office's subpage within the main Weather.gov website includes a main page that contains a variety of information, including, but not limited to, pages featuring current conditions and extended point forecasts for cities served by the office, which can also be accessed through a point map that features active watches, warnings and advisories for the western two-thirds of Oklahoma and western north Texas; an updated roundup of weather observations throughout the County Warning Area at the current hour; information about past and present events involving the Norman forecast area; and, generally, a text-based Hazardous Weather Outlook.

The NWS Norman office also operates social media accounts on Facebook and Twitter to provide short-term forecasts and weather alert information.

=== Local map ===
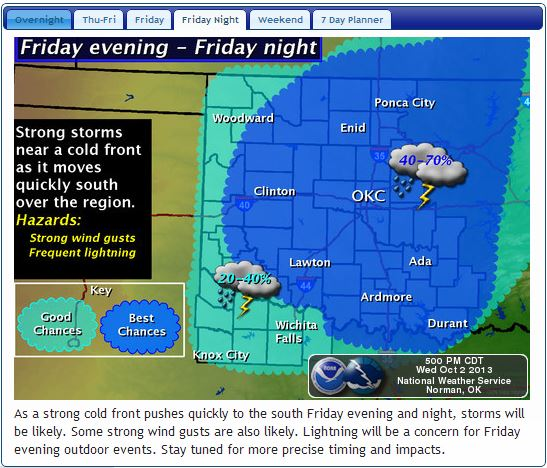
An example of the forecast map displayed on the NWS Norman website's main page.

Among the features included by the Norman office's website is a localized forecast map that is accessible from its front page (similar to others that exist on the sites of other offices operating within the Southern Region Headquarters), which typically outlines current weather observations and forecasted weather conditions over the next two to five days within the Norman Forecast Area, and a diagram depicting a generalized seven-day forecast for the region (accessible through a selection of tabs which varies depending on the conditions expected). However, specialized maps are sometimes incorporated for expected hazardous weather events, including regionalized outlines of SPC-issued severe thunderstorm risk threats, and estimated precipitation amounts for upcoming and ongoing hydrological and winter weather events.

=== Observation data ===
The Norman office's website contains a list of Automated Surface Observing System sites overseen by the National Weather Service within its area of forecasting responsibility, which can be accessed through either the main page of the current weather subpage of the site. These include landing pages containing a log of observation data collected over the past three days at individual sites in region, with updated information generally being added at constant intervals that vary depending on each location.

=== Social media ===
The Norman WFO, like many of the other National Weather Service forecast offices, maintains a large social media presence in order to better communicate hazardous weather information and short-term forecast data to the public. The Norman office posts and uploads weather-related information of determined significance, such as warnings, forecasts, and other updates relevant to its area of forecast responsibility, via Facebook, Twitter and YouTube. On occasion, it also shares important or otherwise relevant links to other sites, as part of an attempt to keep people aware of upcoming weather conditions, particularly those of potential hazard to travel, life or property. As of 2 August 2013, the Norman office's Twitter page had the most followers of any account on that site operated by a NWS WFO, with 26,866 followers, over 19,000 more than the 7,625 that follow the Boston WFO's page, which is the second highest total. In 2023, the Norman office's Twitter account had over 116,500 followers, just 400 more than the Boston's office Twitter account.

== NOAA Weather Radio ==
NOAA Weather Radio logo

The Norman Weather Forecast Office maintains twelve NOAA Weather Radio transmitters across Oklahoma and one in western north Texas to transmit routine extended and specialized short-term forecasts, current weather observations, hazardous weather outlooks and historical weather information. Each of the transmitters, through the Emergency Alert System, also disseminate watches, warnings and advisories issued by the NWS office, severe thunderstorm and tornado watches issued by the Storm Prediction Center and other emergency information to the public.

The office schedules a required weekly test of the Specific Area Message Encoding system for public alert dissemination on all thirteen NOAA Weather Radio transmitters in the region each Wednesday at 12:00 and 7:00 p.m. Central Time; exceptions exist if there is a threat of severe weather that day within the listening area of any or all of the stations, in which case the test will be postponed until the following Wednesday, barring that severe weather is not forecast to occur then.

City of license	Call sign	Frequency (MHz)	Sign-on date	Service area of transmitter
Altus, Oklahoma	WWG97	162.425	June 17, 1998	
Ardmore, Oklahoma	KXI57	162.525	September 6, 1999	
Atoka, Oklahoma	KWN49	162.500	2003	
Chickasha, Oklahoma	KJY94	162.450	January 7, 2007	
Clinton, Oklahoma	WXK87	162.525	January 6, 1979	
Enid, Oklahoma	WXL48	162.475	June 13, 1979	
Lawton, Oklahoma	WXK86	162.550	December 15, 1978	
Oklahoma City, Oklahoma	WXK85	162.400	September 18, 1978	
Ponca City, Oklahoma	WWF42	162.450	September 30, 1994	
Stillwater, Oklahoma	WNG654	162.500	July 13, 2004	
Wewoka, Oklahoma	KJY95	162.550	November 29, 2006	
Wichita Falls, Texas	WXK31	162.475	May 2, 1978	
Woodward, Oklahoma	WWG46	162.500	September 25, 1997	
