= List of Storm Chasers episodes =

This is a list of episodes from the Discovery Channel series, Storm Chasers.

== Series overview ==
Season	Episodes	Season premiere	Season finale
1	4	October 17, 2007	November 7, 2007
2	8	October 19, 2008	December 7, 2008
3	8	October 18, 2009	November 29, 2009
4	8	October 13, 2010	December 1, 2010
5	8	September 25, 2011	November 10, 2011

== Episodes ==
=== Season 1 (2007) ===
During the 2007 season, which consisted of 4 episodes, Josh Wurman and Sean Casey's team used a fleet of three vehicles: the Tornado Intercept Vehicle (or TIV), the Scout (a modified 1993 Nissan Pathfinder), and a Doppler on Wheels (or DOW). Team members for the 2007 season included Herb Stein (DOW driver), Mara McFalls (scout driver/journalist), Justin Walker (scout navigator/meteorologist), Danny Cheresnick (DOW navigator/meteorologist), and Karen Kosiba (DOW navigator/meteorologist).

No. overall	No. in season	Title	Original release date
1	1	"Opening Pursuits"	October 17, 2007
In the first season, the science team, led by Joshua Wurman, and the TIV team, led by IMAX filmmaker Sean Casey, are displayed and new technologies are explained. Sean explains how he has tried to gain an IMAX shot from inside a tornado for the past eight years. As the chase season begins, the TIV attempts to intercept a supercell near Hereford, Texas, before hearing that an EF2 tornado has hit Tulia, Texas. The TIV then tries to intercept a tornado at night (without filming), and succeeds near Stafford, Kansas.
2	2	"A Dangerous Ride"	October 24, 2007
The Storm Chasing team is chasing again after a slow period in the eight-week tornado season. The team is chasing in the Texas Panhandle, where a monster supercell threatens the TIV team as they try to intercept the cell. The team misses and chases into Kansas, where a supercell explodes producing multiple tornadoes near Protection, Kansas. Once again, however, the team fails to intercept the storm.
3	3	"Tornado Aftermath"	October 31, 2007
As the teams try to chase a supercell near La Crosse, Kansas, they hear that an EF5 tornado has struck the town of Greensburg, Kansas (the first tornado in eight years to be given this rating). Before this happened, the team chased a cluster of storms in South Dakota. At the same time, fellow tornado researcher Howie Bluestein manages to intercept a cell near Woodward, Oklahoma. Sean and Josh hear about the Greensburg tornado while in Hays, Kansas, after a long and costly chase day.
4	4	"Direct Hit"	November 7, 2007
In the final weeks of the season, Sean is desperate to get the shot he is trying to achieve. A tornado forms earlier than expected and nearly touches down near Woodward, Oklahoma. In the middle of the episode, the TIV breaks down and the team loses two valuable days chasing. On the last day of the season, all the teams are on the verge of defeat when a cell erupts near Nickerson, Kansas. The TIV manages a valuable intercept and gives Joshua Wurman vital data.

=== Season 2 (2008) ===
For the 2008 season, which consisted of eight episodes, Wurman and Casey's team and its vehicles were expanded and upgraded as follows: 1) the DOW 3 was replaced by the new DOW 6 (based around an International 7500 truck) with improved speed, power and range; 2) the original TIV was augmented by the new TIV 2 (both versions are still used in the field); and 3) two new vehicles, PROBE 1 and PROBE 2 (modified Dodge Ram 1500s), were used to deploy probes. Justin Walker (navigator-meteorologist), and his wife Hannah (driver) rode in PROBE 1, while Danny Cheresnick (navigator) and Aaron Rupert (driver) manned the original Scout vehicle. Beginning this season, the series also followed Reed Timmer and the crew from the website TornadoVideos.net (TVN). The TVN vehicle is a 2008 Chevrolet Tahoe

Due to popular demand, the Storm Chasers series was aired in the UK starting on February 17, 2009. The Science of Storm Chasing series never came to the UK.

No. overall	No. in season	Title	Original release date
5	1	"Tornado Intercept Tank"	October 19, 2008
In the second season, Sean and Josh unveil new scientific equipment to try to get the perfect shot. Sean unleashes TIV 2. Josh unleashes DOW 6 and two new vehicles, PROBE 1 and PROBE 2. The members of Tornadovideos.net are joining the chase, although not working with Sean and Josh. As TIV 2, the DOW and all the probes are finished, Reed Timmer, Joel Taylor and Chris Chittick from Tornadovideos.net get chasing into Texas, and immediately get pounded by a hailstorm. The TIV finally gets moving, and manages only 50 miles before the back axle of the TIV gets split. A supercell appears on radar and nearly gets intercepted by Josh Wurman and his probes while the TIV gets fixed.
6	2	"When Parts Fly"	October 26, 2008
The TIV's axle is still in two pieces, but soon, the whole team is back in action. Reed and Joel (along with Reed's girlfriend Jene Young) intercept a supercell near Lamesa, Texas. The team (Tornadvideos.net) nearly get struck by lightning and nearly catch a violent tornado. The TIV, while chasing in Texas, near Amarillo, loses two of its ten tires. A stone gets caught in the brakes and TIV 2 is out of action again.
7	3	"Mutiny on the Plains"	November 2, 2008
As the season continues, Reed meets up with Sean and Josh while chasing in Kansas. Josh tries to wait and get good data, but Sean is not happy with Josh's decisions. Sean takes TIV 2 for a spin as he and Reed try to intercept in Arkansas. Despite this, Sean cannot catch the Arkansas cells. Reed had driven throughout the night to intercept a supercell late in the day. Josh confronts Sean the next day after the break-up the night before. They revisit Greensburg, Kansas, after it was destroyed the year prior.
8	4	"Nightmare on DOW Street"	November 9, 2008
Six problems with TIV 2 makes Sean abandon it. He decides to go back to the original TIV, and it makes a heroic return. Reed chases just 20 miles away from a deadly tornado in England, Arkansas, while Stuttgart, Arkansas, gets destroyed by an EF3 tornado. The science team and the TIV are trying to intercept the storm in Stuttgart. While chasing, Josh gets a disturbing call as a line of supercells form just 50 miles from their overnight position. The science team is in Stuttgart when the tornado forms, and the team is now being chased. The TIV intercepts the tornado, just after the DOW crosses the path of the twister.
9	5	"Road Hazards"	November 16, 2008
The DOW team is in crisis as the radar refuses to work. Justin Walker, the lead forecaster in the team, scoops the team up. Meanwhile, the scout team, led by Danny Cheresnick and Aaron Rupert, struggle to escape a ditch before a tornado forms and bears down on them. Josh tries to fix the DOW and only figures out what it is too late in the day for any chasing.
10	6	"No Place Like Kansas"	November 23, 2008
The most anticipated day of the year has arrived. Josh and Sean find they are chasing in the same areas as Tornadovideos.net in western Kansas. The DOW and TIV find themselves in Quinter, Kansas as a supercell produces multiple tornadoes. Reed intercepts a cell which produces an "Elephant Trunk" tornado. Both teams try to intercept a cell which nearly causes devastation to Greensburg, Kansas once again. For once, no one wants to see the tornado touch down.
11	7	"Hail to the Beast"	November 30, 2008
As both teams try to gain the perfect shot, Reed's girlfriend Jene Young gets lost in a hailstorm and nearly gets hit by a tornado. Meanwhile, the science team hands over to Karen Kosiba, a PhD student in the DOW, who tries to make the teams drive into a high-precipitation supercell to intercept a tornado.
12	8	"Tornado Showdown"	December 7, 2008
It is the last week of the season. Both teams chase deep into Nebraska as a cell produces a tornado in Kearney. The TIV intercepts. While Sean is in a tornado, the Tornadovideos.net team chase a supercell in Kansas when they nearly get hit by a tornado, but deploy their high-definition probe into the tornado. The TIV has only one more opportunity to make the intercept. The chase is on.

=== Season 3 (2009) ===
On May 18, 2009, Discovery Channel renewed Storm Chasers for a third season, which began airing in the Fall of 2009. Reed Timmer and the TVN team return with their new "SRV Dominator" vehicle. Dr. Josh Wurman and his DOW team have now joined the massive, government-funded VORTEX2 research project, leaving them with little time to aid filmmaker Sean Casey. Casey and his TIV team return in their improved TIV 2, and are now assisted by a new team of meteorologists in TIV Doghouse (a Dodge Ram 2500 equipped with weather radar, GPS and HD filming equipment). A new team known as TWISTEX, led by veteran storm chaser Tim Samaras, along with Carl Young and Tony Laubach, join the series driving TWISTEX Probe (a modified 2003 GMC Sierra Denali) and TWISTEX M1-M3 (three modified Chevy Cobalts). Also returning are Danny Cheresnick and Aaron Ruppert in their SCOUT vehicle (a new 2009 Jeep Wrangler replaces the old Nissan Pathfinder).

Timmer's new SRV Dominator is a heavily modified version of the Chevy Tahoe used in the previous season. The vehicle now features thin armor shell composed of sheet metal and lexan, giving it an appearance similar to Sean Casey's TIV 1. While the new armor allows Timmer and his team to get much closer to a tornado than a conventional vehicle, it cannot actually drive into one like the heavier TIV vehicles. Other additions to Timmer's team include a new advanced radar and an experimental remote controlled aircraft with a 12-foot wingspan, designed to fly around tornadoes with an advanced auto-pilot system, and drop small probes into tornadoes.

The first episode starts with the TVN crew explaining their new vehicle, the "SRV Dominator", which is a heavy modified Chevy Tahoe, made like the TIV, but not heavy or strong enough to actually drive into a tornado. While TVN was on their first chase, they were able to get close to and record an EF1 tornado in Oklahoma. Meanwhile, Sean explained his new chase crew does not feature anybody from last season other than the TIV crew. While on their first chase, Sean's team gets lost and misses the first tornado of the season.

The VORTEX2 team (Josh Wurman and the DOW, the Walkers, and the others) did not appear until the 3rd episode, and do not appear again until the 7th episode. The scout team only appeared in the 4th episode.

No. overall	No. in season	Title	Original release date
13	1	"Storm Catchers"	October 18, 2009
The season begins with the TIV team and their Doghouse support vehicle, the TVN team in their SRV Dominator, and the TWISTEX team. Reed and the TVN team have early success, nearly driving their new vehicle directly into an EF1 tornado in Oklahoma. The TIV team, still chasing in TIV 1, while waiting for the repairs/modifications on TIV 2 to be completed, has a bad first day when communications and navigation problems cause them to miss a potential intercept.
14	2	"Bigger In Texas"	October 25, 2009
Sean and Reed have a tense and awkward meeting at the New Mexico border. Sean, who was already annoyed at Reed's early success and general attitude, was further annoyed by Reed's new vehicle, the SRV Dominator, which he felt was a blatant attempt to copy his TIV idea. The TWISTEX team has a successful day, coming within a few hundred feet of an EF2 tornado. The TVN team enjoys slightly less success without their usual driver, Joel Taylor. The TIV team has another bad day, as communication problems once again cause them to miss a valuable intercept, and taking a muddy road causes both TIV 1 and Doghouse to get stuck.
15	3	"Highway to Hail"	November 1, 2009
Reed steps up his science to take on Dr. Josh Wurman's massive research project. However, when his decision to mount a small radar on his vehicle threatens to interfere with Dr. Wurman's project, tensions between the two rise. TVN's driver Joel Taylor has second thoughts about chasing with the team when his and Reed's relationship becomes strained. With his much improved TIV 2 finally out of the shop, Sean is feeling confident and happy to rejoin his old chasing partner, Dr. Wurman and his new VORTEX2 project. However, when Dr. Wurman seem less than thrilled to see Sean, and makes it clear that getting TIV 2 inside a tornado is no longer high on his list of priorities, Sean is somewhat offended, and decides to resume chasing alone with Doghouse, at least temporarily.
16	4	"Inside the Tornado"	November 8, 2009
TIV 2 suffers another mechanical failure, leaving Sean Casey on the sidelines. Joel Taylor decides not to chase with Reed and instead joins the SCOUT team of Danny Cheresnick and Aaron Ruppert on a chase in Oklahoma. However, on the same day, Reed and the TVN team become the first to record ground-level radar data from inside a tornado when their SRV Dominator is engulfed by a vortex near Kirksville, Missouri. Nearby, the TWISTEX team has close encounters with the same storm system. Also joining the TVN team is a guy named Hank Reinhardt.
17	5	"Not in Kansas Anymore"	November 15, 2009
Reed, Tim, and Sean encounter the strongest tornado conditions of the season. Two strong risk areas have developed over Colorado and in Northeast Kansas. All three teams decide to pursue the eastern event as it crosses from Kansas into Missouri. Each team's efforts to keep up with a developing supercell are hampered by road-clogging scores of amateur chase vehicles all trying to get a glimpse of the same storm, but the storm did not form a tornado. Adding insult to injury, Tony is stunned to learn that a strong tornado has struck his and Tim's hometown of Bennett, Colorado (a result of the western storm system they had chosen to ignore that day). Frustrated and exhausted, TWISTEX decides to chase a low-risk event in Western Kansas the following day, and manages a successful intercept.
18	6	"Fight or Flight"	November 22, 2009
Reed and Sean chase in central Kansas, and successfully encounter a developing supercell. Sean is in perfect position to intercept, but both he and the Doghouse have difficulty finding the tornado as it becomes cloaked in precipitation. Reed relishes the opportunity to launch his $30,000 remote-control airplane, which successfully deploys three parachute probes into the tornado's inflow, gathering vital data. However, Reed quickly finds himself in a vulnerable position when the tornado begins to take an erratic path and doubles back on itself (and the Dominator).
19	7	"Sean Casey at the Bat"	November 29, 2009
Sean returns chasing with his old chase partner, Dr. Josh Wurman and his new giant project, VORTEX2 and DOW 7. In Wyoming, TIV 2 intercepts an EF3 tornado, and Sean gets the shot of the tornado coming directly in his direction and impacting the TIV, the shot he chased for ten years. Meanwhile, Reed follows the same storm. He drives into hail storms and the Dominator temporarily gets stuck in the mud.
20	8	"EF-3 Strikes You're Out"	November 29, 2009
As the season comes to a close, Reed is left bloodied when a violent tornado shatters one of the Dominator's windows. Meanwhile, Tim's team has their own close encounter as they deploy probes in the last chase of the year. Having ended their chasing season in the previous episode, Sean Casey and his team are absent from this episode.

=== Season 4 (2010) ===
The fourth season of Storm Chasers premiered Wednesday, October 13, 2010 at 10 pm Eastern, and documents teams of storm chasers during the spring and summer of 2010. This season continues to feature the three groups from the previous season: The TVN team, led by Reed Timmer, and rejoined by driver Joel Taylor, who had temporarily left the team the previous year. IMAX filmmaker Sean Casey returns seeking better tornado footage, this time employing a second-unit IMAX crew to film TIV 2 itself. The TWISTEX team, led by veteran storm chaser Tim Samaras, also returns with a new "TWISTEX Probe" vehicle (a 2008 GMC Sierra HD with extensive weather instrumentation). One of the major events early in the season was the TVN crew's encounter with the aftermath of an EF4 tornado that struck Yazoo City, Mississippi. This was the last season to feature TIV 2 navigator Matt Hughes, who died on May 26, 2010. Matt's last chase was in the episode "Dedication", which is dedicated to him. Dr. Josh Wurman and his DOW team continues working as part of the massive, 2 year government-funded VORTEX2 project.

No. overall	No. in season	Title	Original release date
21	1	"What Goes Around"	October 13, 2010
Reed and Joel bury the hatchet to face a new tornado season, but armor offers little protection when the roof blows off the new Dominator. Sean mixes up his crew and unleashes tension in the path of a West Texas twister. Team Dominator is the only team to drive all the way to Mississippi for tornadoes.
22	2	"Why We Chase"	October 20, 2010
Reed, Joel and Chris are the first to arrive on the scene in Yazoo City, Mississippi, where a tornado had cut a path of destruction through the town. They temporarily give up the chase to aid the injured and search for survivors under the debris, risking their own lives to rescue those trapped.
23	3	"Back Seat Driver"	October 27, 2010
As the storm chasers pursue the tornado outbreak of April 30 – May 2, 2010, dissent grows amongst Sean's crew as TIV 2 continues to miss intercepts, and Byron Turk quits the team. Reed brings in his girlfriend, television meteorologist Ginger Zee, temporarily booting Chris out of his seat in the Dominator.
24	4	"Dedication"	November 3, 2010
Dr. Josh Wurman of the VORTEX2 project is no longer allowed to provide guidance to the TIV 2 team, leading Sean Casey to hand over more navigation control to his meteorologists. Under Matt Hughes' guidance, TIV 2 intercepts one of its best tornadoes ever. This is the last episode to feature TIV 2 navigator Matt Hughes, who died on May 26, 2010 of an "injury unrelated to storm chasing". This episode is dedicated to him.
25	5	"Smoke Monster"	November 10, 2010
Sean, Reed, Tim, and the rest of the team must deal with the death of their team member, Matt Hughes. While they are grieving, they must pick up the pieces and finish the rest of the storm chasing season without Matt. Then, Sean fears for the future of his film after a chaser uploads a video showing TIV 2 recklessly passing a string of slow-moving cars during a tornado, which could jeopardize funding from the VORTEX2 program. Reed grows restless as he misses a chase while the Dominator is fitted with probe cannons, and the TWISTEX team has a successful probe intercept.
26	6	"Perfect Storm"	November 17, 2010
When a massive storm cell threatens to strike South Dakota, the storm chasing teams travel the state's highways in hopes of witnessing powerful tornadoes, and their wish is granted when the storm spawns a series of twisters. Sean is devastated when Dr. Wurman recommends that TIV 2 be sent home. Meanwhile, all three teams of storm chasers surround the slow moving Bowdle tornado as it demolishes farms and transmission towers.
27	7	"Twister Twilight Zone"	November 24, 2010
Reed is so excited to use his new probe cannon that he has trouble perfecting his aim when he's confronted with a series of tornadoes. While he does succeed in getting a probe into a tornado, the tornado carries the probe too far, and the team is unable to retrieve it. While Tim is away, the TWISTEX team weathers some strange atmospheric occurrences in South Dakota, and ends up getting pinned between two violent twisters, but luckily make it out safely. Sean and Josh Wurman agree that TIV 2 may continue operating, but only if it maintains a 75-mile distance from VORTEX2, which leads to frustration when both teams target the same storms, with VORTEX2 actually switching storms to Sean's after taking one storm, forcing Sean's team to back off when they had a good chance at an intercept.
28	8	"Judgment Day"	December 1, 2010
Storms and chasers collide in Minnesota for a final showdown. Sean's team gets a break as VORTEX2 calls off all operations for the day, leading to no conflict between the teams. TIV 2 breaks down early on, but luckily, the garage they stop at has the part they need, and it is repaired quickly. As a ferocious EF4 twister targets the town of Wadena, Minnesota, one team finds themselves in the wrong place at the right time, and Sean's trial by fire becomes a race to save others. Dominator succeeds in intercepting the tornado and gets probes into it, but TIV 2 fails to intercept while TWISTEX is too far away. Wadena is demolished, and Sean's team is in the middle of town as it happens, and in the aftermath, both Sean's and Tim's teams do their best to save lives.

=== Special (2010) ===
Title	Original release date
"Storm Chasers: Behind the Storms"	December 8, 2010
This special features interviews and documentary footage with the show's production crew, explaining how they accompany the storm chasing teams and the difficulties they encounter working under intense conditions. It shows the main camera angles too.

=== Tornado Rampage 2011 ===
A one-hour Discovery Channel special documenting the 2011 Super Outbreak, which struck the Southeastern United States. It focuses on video captured by Reed Timmer as well as the videos and experiences from non-storm chasers who survived the tornadoes.

Title	Original release date
"Storm Chasers: Tornado Rampage 2011"	May 22, 2011
Documenting the tornado outbreak which struck the Southeastern United States from April 25–28. It is also an episode focused on video from Reed Timmer. Plus, it has the experiences from people who survived the tornadoes.

=== Special (2011) ===
The fifth season of Storm Chasers premiered Sunday, September 25, 2011 at 10 pm Eastern, and documents teams of storm chasers during the spring and summer of 2011.

Title	Original release date
"Greatest Storms 2011"	September 25, 2011

=== Season 5 (2011) ===
No. overall	No. in season	Title	Original release date
29	1	"Dixie Alley Outbreak"	September 25, 2011
April 27th, 2011 will go down as the deadliest tornado day in well over half a century. Hundreds of twisters are touching down all over parts of Mississippi and Alabama, known to chasers as "Dixie Alley". There were multiple EF5 tornadoes, the most powerful classification. Teams Dominator, TWISTEX and TIV are all in Dixie Alley and on the hunt, with front row seats to some of the day's most breathtaking storms. Acting as storm spotters, they're reporting the tornadoes and attempting to get warnings out. But when a violent twister tracks toward the heart of Tuscaloosa, Alabama, all three teams are faced with death and destruction on an unimaginable scale. Chronologically occurs between episodes 3 and 4 of season 5.
30	2	"Storms Over St. Louis"	October 2, 2011
It's the most violent tornado season in over fifty years, with death and destruction savaging the Midwestern Plains before chase season has even begun. Now there's a powerful storm tracking toward downtown St. Louis, and after a hot start to the season, Reed Timmer has suddenly lost his mojo. A series of bad decisions leaves team Dominator out of position and at each other's throats. After completing an IMAX film that was ten years in the making, Sean Casey is using his armored TIV to film a sequel in 3D, but first, he needs to find the right storm. Tim Samaras and team TWISTEX follow the path of destruction into the St. Louis area, and in an attempt to place their probe in the path of a tornado, they end up chasing too close.
31	3	"Reed's Redemption"	October 9, 2011
After failing to find a twister on two consecutive chases, Reed Timmer and the Dominator team are desperate to chase one down. They're even desperate enough to pursue a powerful storm into an urban area after dark, one of the most dangerous possible chasing scenarios. Team TWISTEX's truck threatens to keep them on the sidelines on a promising tornado day. While team Dominator pursues an intercept, the TIV team is hoping to finally shoot their first ever 3D tornado footage, but tension in the vehicle has everyone on edge, and the crew is finding out that the only thing worse than having a chase ruined by the slick, Texas mud is to be helpless in the path of a tornado.
32	4	"Aftermath"	October 16, 2011
In the wake of the 2011 Super Outbreak, all three chase teams take time to help with the recovery effort. Team TIV is in Smithville, Mississippi, and Team Dominator and Team TWISTEX are in Tuscaloosa, Alabama. Motivated by the death and destruction they've witnessed, all three teams are rededicated to improving warning times and doing vital research on these deadly storms. Team Dominator fields a new and improved vehicle, the Dominator 2, and tracks a storm right toward one member's childhood home. Team TWISTEX outfits their truck with a brand new probe and a mobile Doppler radar, but mechanical issues threaten to sideline them again. Team TIV adds a mobile tornado siren and chases toward the heart of a twister to warn people while shooting 3D twister footage.
33	5	"No Rest For The Weary"	October 23, 2011
Team Dominator takes the day off, but when Team TIV scores a victory in Reed's own backyard, Reed vows to chase with a vengeance. Meanwhile, tensions within Team TWISTEX continues to rise as Tim grows more wary about his new equipment while chasing storms in Kansas.
34	6	"Too Close To Home"	October 30, 2011
A tornado outbreak in Elk City, Oklahoma threatens to wreak havoc in team Dominator's backyard. The TIV team follows their navigator's bold prediction, with the success of their mission hanging in the balance. Tension over too much caution threatens to derail team TWISTEX's chase on a huge day.
35	7	"The Storm Within"	November 3, 2011
Team Dominator risks everything to warn people in the path of a violent storm, but internal conflicts causes driver Joel to leave, complicating Team Dominator's operations. Still gun shy after witnessing devastation this season, Sean Casey starts to lack the passion of chasing storms, until a visit from his wife and a successful chase reignites Team TIV's fire. Team TWISTEX tries to brave the elements by chasing a tornado through a hail storm, but after their vehicles suffer damage, Tim has to swallow his pride and abandon the chase.
36	8	"All Or Nothing"	November 10, 2011
It's the last chase of the season, and Mother Nature is going out with a bang. Team Dominator's Dominator 2 is 100% ready for the first time this season, and they end up chasing a monster tornado for a radar intercept. Team TWISTEX has one last chance to successfully deploy their probe while TIV still needs 3D footage from inside a twister. But how do you pick one that won't kill you?

=== Behind the Storms special (2011) ===
Title	Original release date
"Behind the storms 2011"	December 26, 2011
Behind the scenes with cast and crew.
