= 2010 Wadena tornado =

2010 EF4 tornado in Minnesota, USA

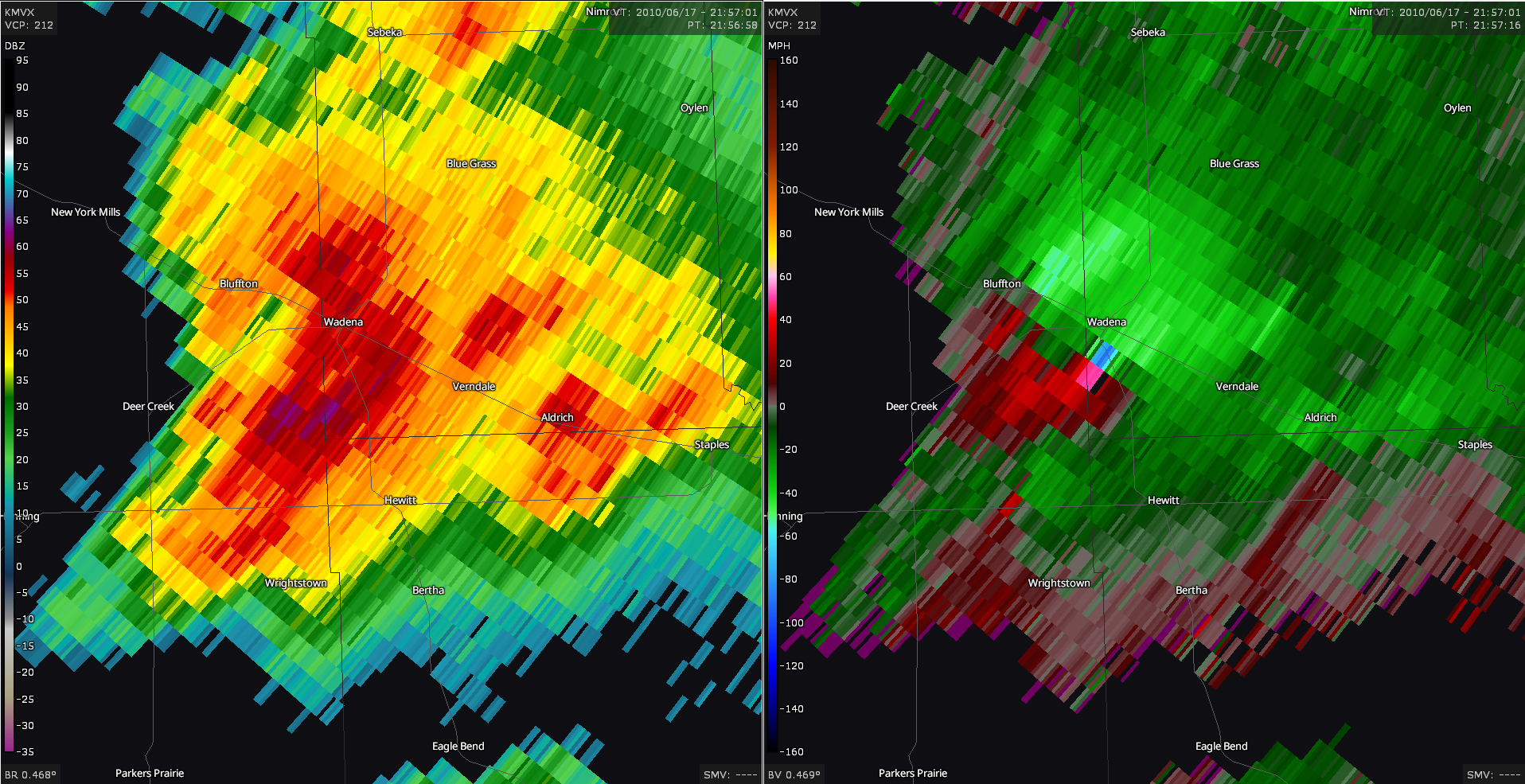
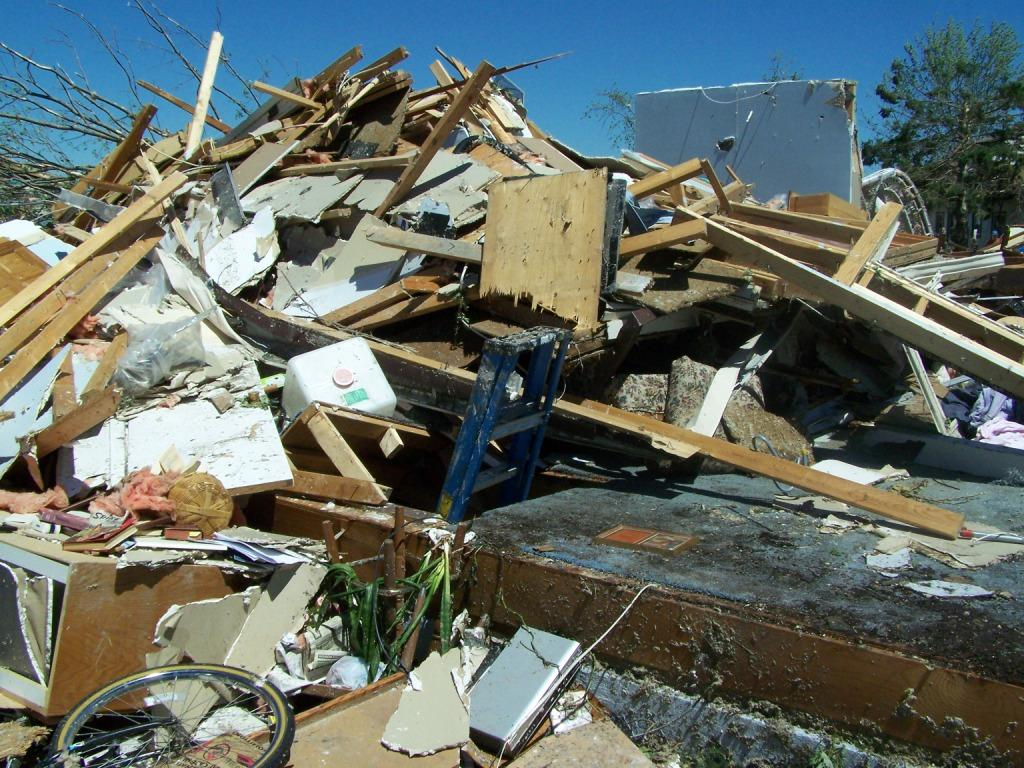
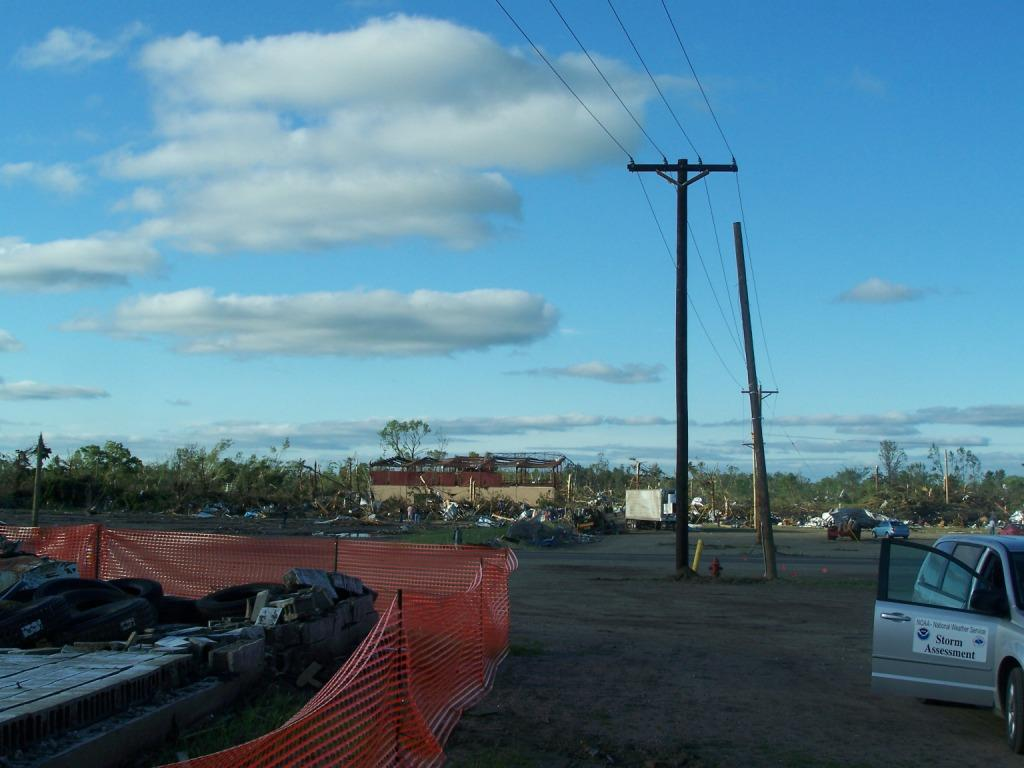
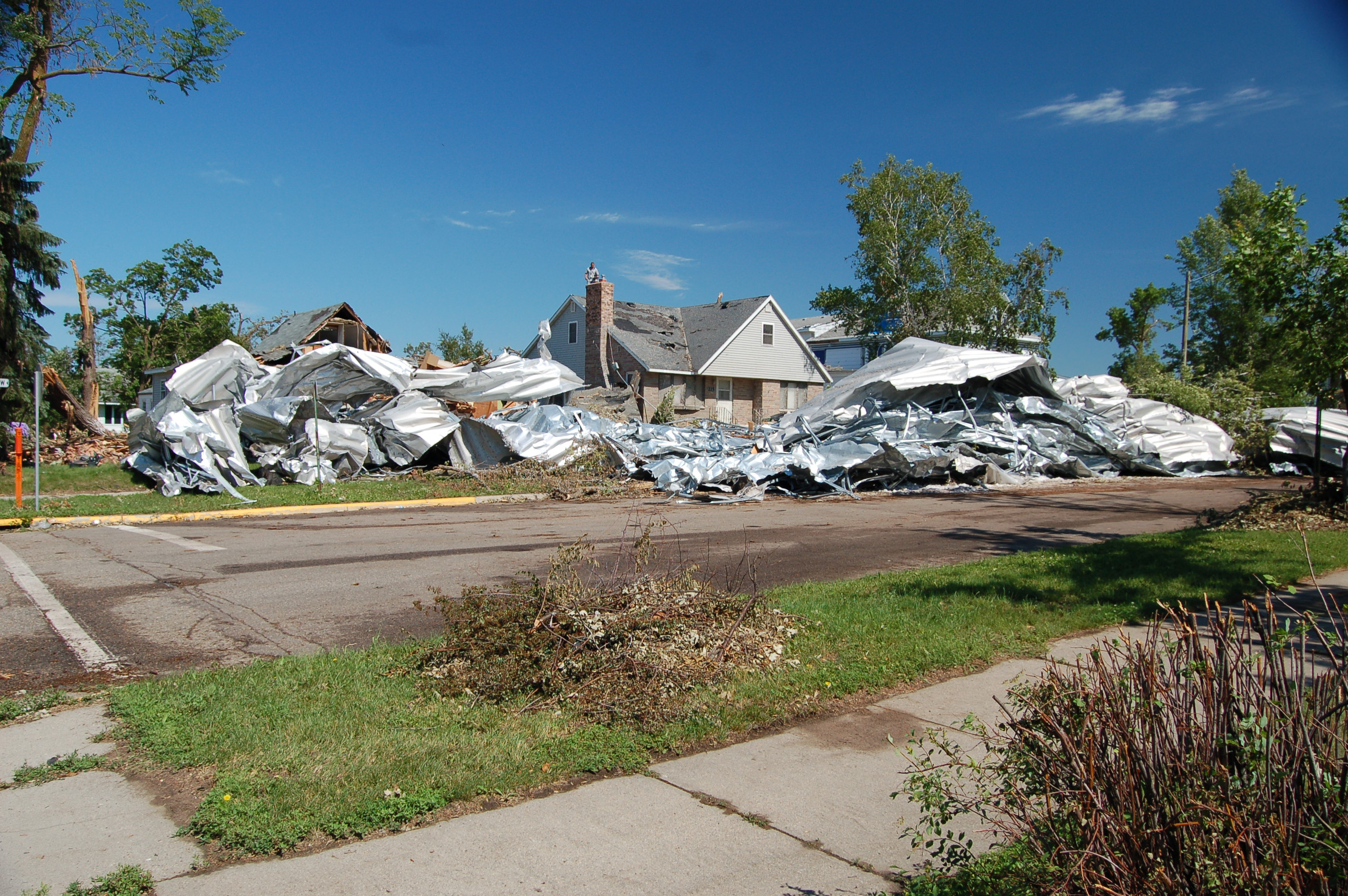
- Clockwise: The rainwrapped EF4 tornado seen from a distance, a destroyed home in Wadena, debris littered in a neighborhood, view of damage in the city of Wadena, a Next-Generation Radar (NEXRAD) scan of the violent tornado.

Meteorological history
- Formed: June 17, 2010, 4:59 p.m. CDT (UTC−05:00)
- Dissipated: June 17, 2010, 5:16 p.m. CDT (UTC-05:00)
- Duration: 17 minutes

EF4 tornado
- on the Enhanced Fujita scale
- Max width: 1,936 yd (1.1 mi; 1.8 km)
- Path length: 10 miles (16 km)
- Highest winds: 170 mph (270 km/h)

Overall effects
- Fatalities: 0
- Injuries: 20
- Damage: $32 million (2010 USD)
- Areas affected: Otter Tail and Wadena counties; particularly the city of Wadena, Minnesota, United States.
- Part of the June 2010 Northern Plains tornado outbreak and Tornadoes of 2010

On June 17, 2010, a large, rain-wrapped, and damaging EF4 tornado directly struck the city of Wadena, Minnesota. It was part of a widespread and prolific tornado outbreak across portions of the Upper Midwest region of the United States. The tornado caused severe levels of devastation across parts of the city, with the tornado becoming the costliest of the entire outbreak, as monetary losses were estimated at $32 million (USD). 20 people were injured during the event, though no fatalities were reported.

The outbreak responsible for the tornadoes across primarily North Dakota and Minnesota, including the tornado that impacted Wadena, lasted from June 16 to 18. The tornado was rated at low-end EF4 by the National Weather Service office in Grand Forks, North Dakota, with estimated winds of 170 mph (270 km/h). It tracked a 10 mi (16 km) path across eastern Otter Tail and Wadena counties with a maximum width of 1,936 yd (1.1 mi; 1.8 km). It was the first time the state of Minnesota had seen a violent (F4/EF4+) tornado, since an F4 tornado tore through Granite Falls on July 25, 2000. The parent storm responsible for the EF4 tornado, was a long-lived supercell that formed in Stevens County, Minnesota, and lasted for more than 3 hours. It spawned a family of tornadoes during its life until dissipating in Cass County, Minnesota.

== Meteorological synopsis ==
SPC outlooks on June 17, 2010.

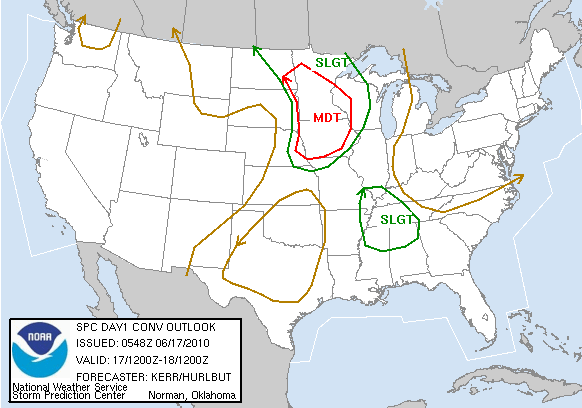
Day 1 06z categorical outlooks.

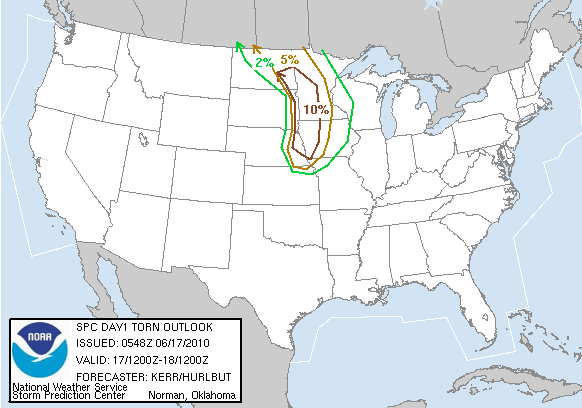
Day 1 06z tornado outlooks.

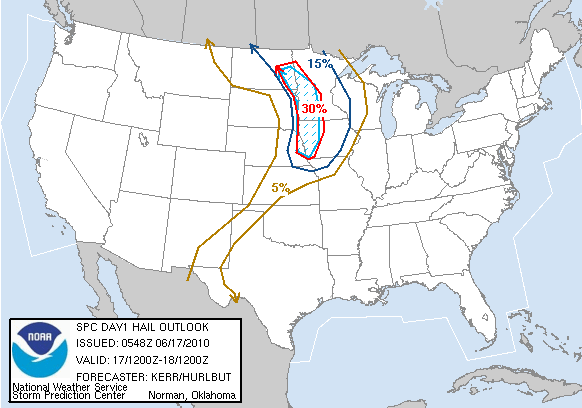
Day 1 06z hail outlooks.

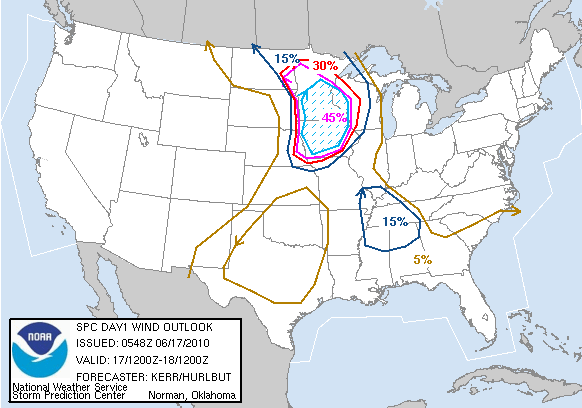
Day 1 06z wind outlooks.

=== Episode narrative ===
After midnight at 12:48 a.m CDT (05:48 UTC) on June 17, 2010, the Storm Prediction Center issued a Public Severe Weather Outlook (PWO) spanning a large region for mainly Minnesota and Iowa, but also across the eastern Dakotas, western Wisconsin and eastern Nebraska. Forecasters cited a (categorical) moderate risk of severe weather across this region of the Midwestern United States, with a 10% tornado risk in nearly the same place, over the Red and Missouri River Valleys. A large-scale trough was forecasted to be stationed across the Pacific Northwest, towards the Rocky Mountains. A negatively tilted short-wave trough was lifting out of the Great Basin region into the northern Great Plains, to the east of a developing mid-level circulation along the central Canada–United States border. Forecasters note that this was likely accompanied by a deep, weakening surface-based cyclone, with an expected cold front moving through the central and northern Great Plains and Upper Mississippi River Valley at 12:00 p.m UTC (7:00 a.m. CDT).

Forecasting models painted a concerning picture about the evolution of a frontal occlusion, and a dry line up ahead across the Missouri and Red River Valleys, possibly caused by early day convection. An unstable air mass was expected to develop around this region, up to the Upper Mississippi River Valley. Underneath a warm nose, air from the elevated mixed layer (EML) emanated from the Colorado Plateau, causing a capping inversion and preventing storms from firing too early. Dew points were expected to rise up to 70° degrees Fahrenheit (21.1° Celsius) or higher around peak day time heating, the same time Mixed Layer Convective Available Potential Energy (MLCAPE) values of 2000-3000 joules per kilogram (J/kg) were possible to occur, giving storms much energy to sustain themselves.

=== Event narrative ===
Forecasters noted that boundary layered storms were expected to form as the leading edge of upper mid-level cooling, related to the upper trough that was assumed to spread over the warm sector, during the late afternoon hours on June 17. A small window of opportunity for isolated storms was in place, with any such being able to take advantage have the backing of vertical shear in the 50-70 knot (kt) range from a 500 millibar (mbar) jet streak that moved to the west. Any supercell in this environment had the capability to produce tornadoes, some of them being strong.

Alongside tornadoes, the Storm Prediction Center forecasted the possibility of a widespread mesoscale convective system that would move through Minnesota and Iowa into the evening and overnight hours. This was assumed due to a weakness in the high-level flow, underneath the jet streaks. A damaging wind risk of 45% was put in place over the same area the categorical moderate risk spanned over Minnesota and Iowa.

== Tornado summary ==
=== Initial long-track tornado ===
Prior to the development of what would be the Wadena tornado, over an hour prior at 3:43 p.m. CDT (20:43 UTC), a separate supercell ahead, dropped a massive and long-lived multiple-vortex tornado in northern Douglas County, before quickly moving northward into southeastern Otter Tail County and narrowly striking the community of Almora. This large and violent EF4 wedge tornado, with winds up to 175 mph (282 km/h) destroyed numerous farmhouses near Deer Creek, Bluffton and New York Mills, Minnesota, across eastern Otter Tail County. It traveled along a 39.56 mi (63.67 km) long path, and had with a maximum width of 2,288 yd (1.3 mi; 2.1 km) before dissipating at 4:45 p.m. CDT (21:45 UTC). One person near Almora was killed, while five others were injured.

=== Touch down in Otter Tail County ===
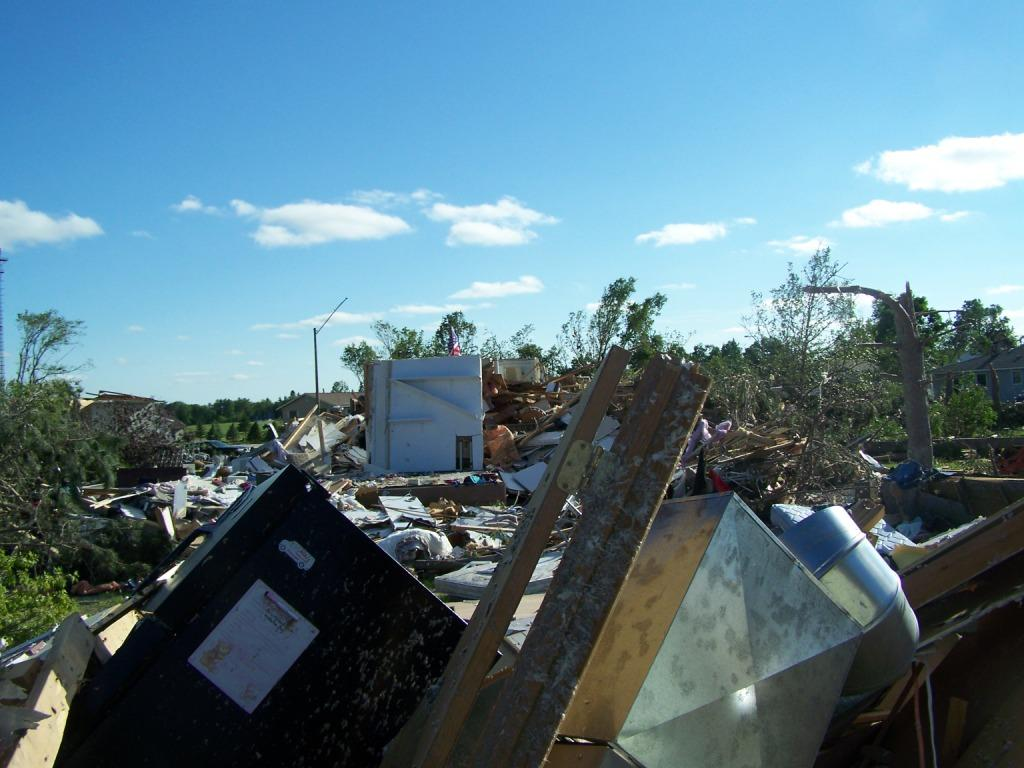
Leveled home in the Wadena area.

At 4:56 pm CDT (21:56 UTC), a tornado warning was issued for areas in Becker, Clearwater, Hubbard, Otter Tail and Wadena counties, as a supercell moved through, spawning a short-lived EF1 tornado prior southeast of Deer Creek. A few minutes after the warning was issued, the storm put down another, much stronger tornado at 4:59 pm CDT (21:59 UTC). This large, multiple-vortex tornado developed 2 miles (3.2 km) west of the Otter Tail-Wadena County border, southwest of Wadena. Within three minutes after its formation, the tornado rapidly intensified, producing substantial damage to trees as most were snapped or uprooted before the tornado entered Wadena County.

=== Entrance into Wadena County and city ===
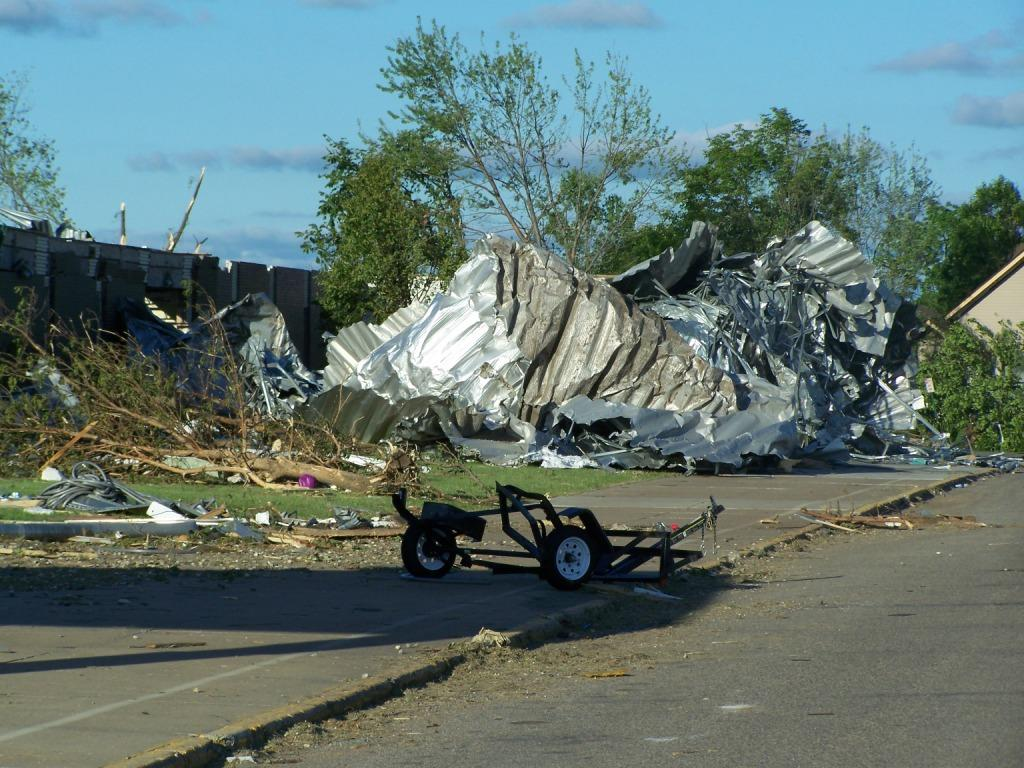
A metal building that was completely destroyed in Wadena.

The large tornado then entered the western side of the city of Wadena at 5:02 pm CDT (22:02 UTC). Widespread damage began as the tornado plowed through neighborhoods north along Olmstead Avenue SW. Heading north into the western city limits, numerous residences were flattened, while one house was completely destroyed and swept off the foundation. Many other homes and businesses in this large area of Wadena suffered extensive destruction. On Franklin Drive SW, the tornado impacted the Wadena Cemetery Association, where many headstones were overturned as the storm went through.

After crossing Colfax Avenue SW, it damaged the Wadena-Deer Creek Middle/High School as parts of the roof and inner walls of the building were collapsed. The school had an all-day reunion ongoing, with many people attending and sheltering from the tornado as it struck. School buses and nearby vehicles were thrown into the air for hundreds of yards, before being slammed back down into the ground. Passing over US 10, the tornado hit the city's fairgrounds area, destroying eight buildings, including the grandstand. More neighborhoods to the northeast of the fairgrounds were significantly impacted, before the tornado left through the northern side of Wadena after having caused EF4 damage.

=== Exit and dissipation ===
After leaving Wadena to the northeast, a tornado emergency was issued for Sebeka and Nimrod, though ultimately both communities never were struck by the tornado. One property 2 miles (3.2 km) north of Wadena was impacted, with five buildings and hundreds of trees destroyed. After traveling for 8 miles (13 km), the tornado dissipated next a farmstead on 204th Street, south-southeast of Sebeka at 5:16 pm CDT (22:16 UTC).

== Aftermath ==
=== Historical statistics ===
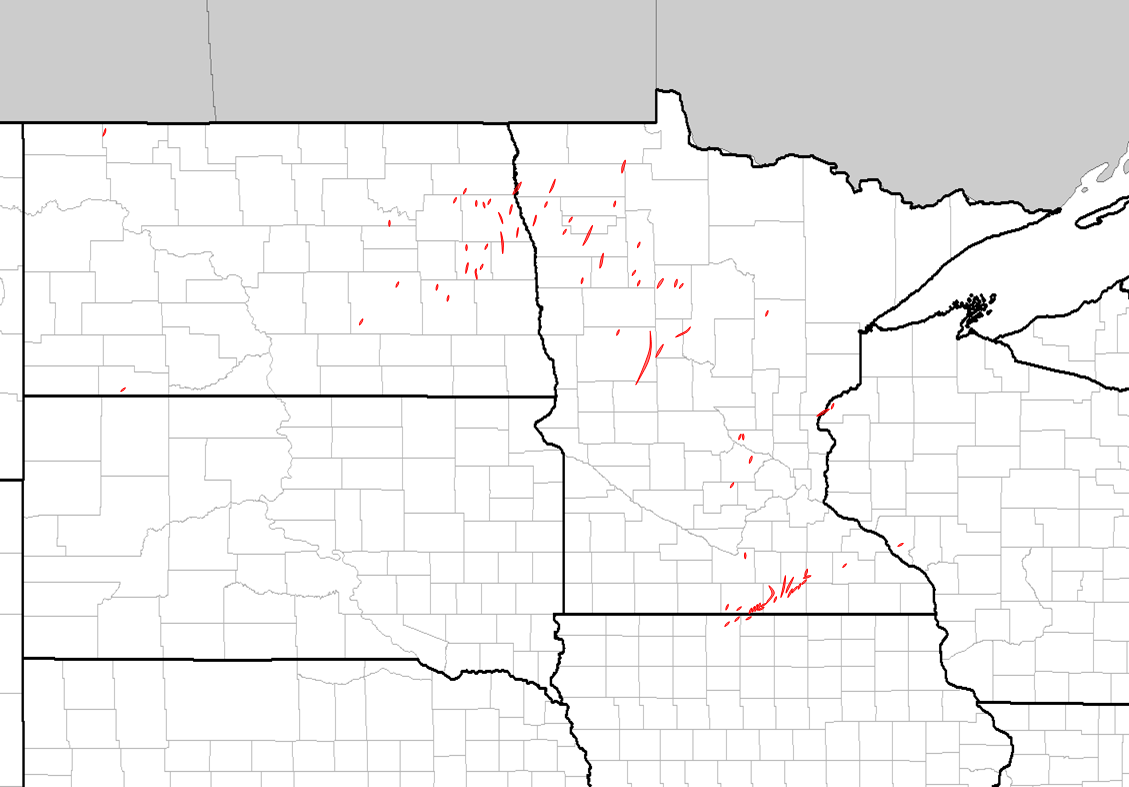
Map of all confirmed tornadoes throughout mainly North Dakota and Minnesota on June 17, 2010.

The tornado that struck Wadena was among the four that struck across the upper Midwestern United States and upper Mississippi River Valley during the June 2010 Northern Plains tornado outbreak, especially among the three violent tornadoes that struck Minnesota alone on June 17, 2010. This represented the first time that Minnesota had ever recorded a violent tornado within its borders since the F4 tornado that struck Yellow Medicine County and the city of Granite Falls on July 25, 2000. As well for the state was this the first time multiple violent tornadoes struck within the borders since a late-April 1967 outbreak. Despite the tornado going through relatively urbanized areas, 20 people were injured and no fatalities were reported. In total, storms on June 17 caused US$35.5 million in damages throughout Minnesota, with US$32 million to Wadena alone according to a Federal Emergency Management Agency (FEMA) report. This made the Wadena tornado the most damaging tornado of the June 16–18, 2010 outbreak.

=== Recovery and efforts ===
The day following the tornado, the Minnesota National Guard arrived into Wadena to help residents and provide assistance. This was issued by Governor Tim Pawlenty in response to the severe tornado and weather outbreak in the region. The Wadena City Council, which consisted of county commissioners from Wadena and Otter Tail counties, declared the city to be a major disaster area. Then preliminary assessments concluded that the tornado significantly damaged about 234 homes and 20 city blocks in southwestern and northwestern Wadena. On June 22, FEMA and state surveyors assessed the damage in the city, and several counties throughout northwestern and southern Minnesota, whether a major disaster declaration was sufficient to be granted by President Barack Obama. On July 2, the Obama administration granted a federal emergency declaration (FEMA-1921-DR) for Minnesota. Areas that were affected by the severe weather events were Faribault, Freeborn, Olmsted, Polk, Steele, Otter Tail and Wadena counties, as parts of the state were also flooded after the tornadoes, which lasted until June 26.

== In popular media ==
=== Storm Chasers ===
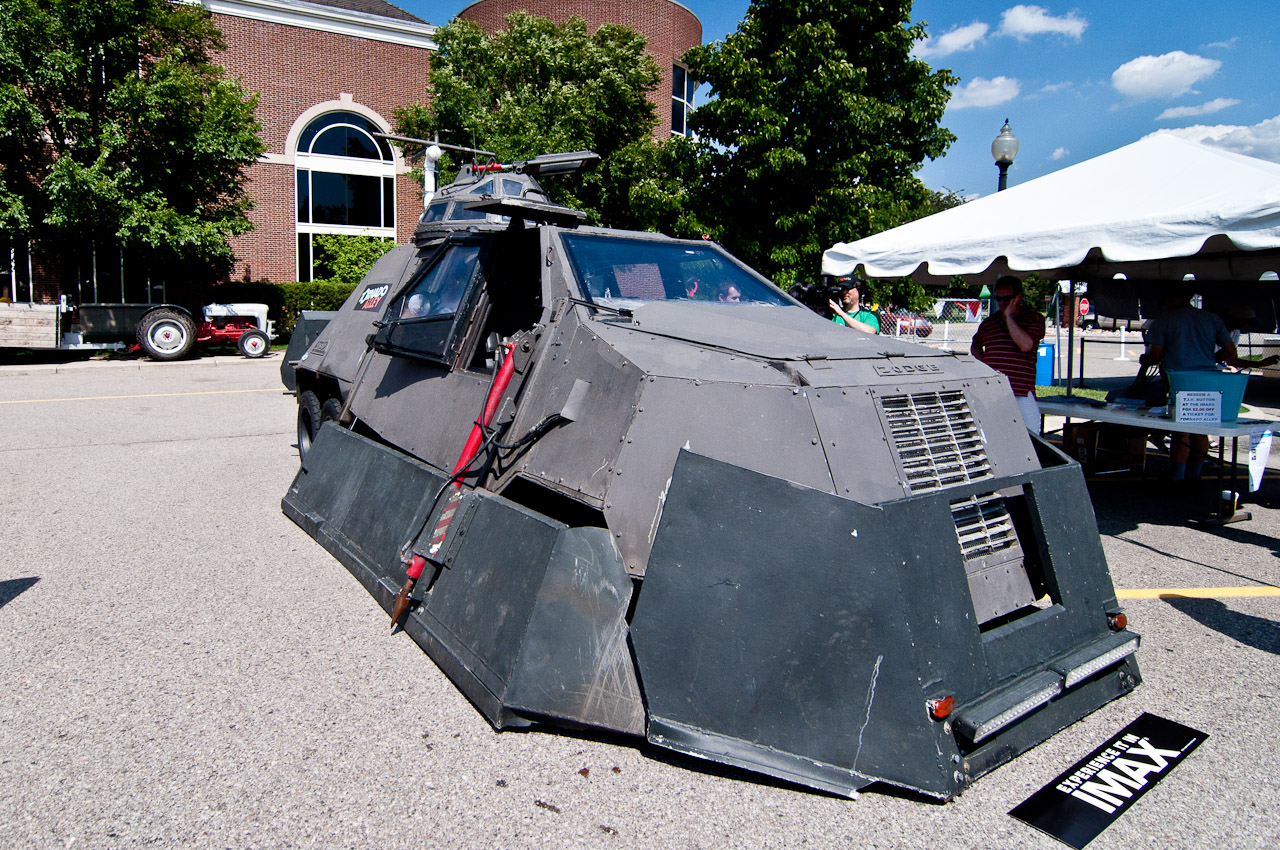
The Tornado Intercept Vehicle 2 (TIV 2) shown on display in 2011.

The June 17, 2010 event was shown in the fourth season finale of the documentary television series Storm Chasers, titled "Judgement Day". In the episode, Sean Casey and the Tornado Intercept Vehicle (TIV) crew, alongside Reed Timmer and Team Dominator, and the TWISTEX crew are stationed in central to eastern North Dakota prior to the development of storms. Sean and Reed, alongside their respective teammates, often were mocking each other during their rivalry. TWISTEX from their part failed in their objectives, being too late for the storms in Minnesota. Meanwhile, miles southwest of Wadena in eastern Otter Tail County, Team Dominator and the TIV crew, were having a competitive showdown as both teams were trying to intercept the initial large, and violent EF4 wedge tornado. The TIV crew deployed their TIV 2 interceptor vehicle on the edge of the tornadic circulation, with Sean not wanting to risk a closer intercept. Reed and Team Dominator meanwhile drove up ahead of Sean and launched meteorological probes from the Dominator 1 interceptor vehicle into the tornado's inflow region. The team deployed the interceptor vehicle, which began to buffet and skid in the intense rear flank downdraft surges of the tornado.

After a while, the TIV crew found themselves in Wadena, seeing the second EF4 tornado tear directly through the city. After the tornado passed, the team immediately went into search and rescue. One of the team members, Marcus Gutierrez, a US Navy trained medic, helped a man who suffered from a lower lumbar strain get transported into an ambulance. The TWISTEX crew and Team Dominator also arrived on scene later near and in Wadena, helping anyone in need.

=== Tornado Alley ===
The TIV crew during their chase on June 17, 2010, recorded the events on an IMAX film camera, inside the TIV 2 interceptor vehicle. On September 21, 2012, Sean Casey released a premiere of his 3D film Tornado Alley at the Science Museum of Minnesota's Omnitheater in St. Paul, Minnesota. The film includes intercepting footage, damage aftermath and aerial view points, most being borrowed from the Storm Chasers series. Tornado Alley was scheduled to show through June 2013.

== See also ==
- Tornadoes of 2010
- List of F4 and EF4 tornadoes (2010–2019)
- 2010 Conger–Albert Lea tornado – Another violent EF4 tornado that occurred the same day in southern Minnesota.
- 2020 Ashby–Dalton tornado – A violent EF4 tornado that occurred in Otter Tail County, Minnesota 10 years later.
- 2010 Millbury tornado – A deadly, nocturnal EF4 tornado that occurred in Ohio 12 days prior.
- 2014 Pilger tornado family – A destructive tornado family that occurred in Nebraska 4 years later.
