= Storm Chasers (TV series) =

American documentary television series

- 4-5 title screen shot of Storm Chasers
- Genre: Documentary; Reality; Weather
- Created by: Sean Casey; Joshua Wurman; Reed Timmer; Tim Samaras; Tony Laubach; Carl Young (storm chaser); Matt Grzych; Brandon Ivey; Matt Hughes; Chris Chittick; Byron Turk; Charlie Corwin; Brian Nashel; Ronan Nagle; Jay Peterson
- Starring: Sean Casey; Marcus S Gutierrez (TIV Driver Medic); Joshua Wurman; Reed Timmer; Tim Samaras; Tony Laubach; Carl Young; Matt Grzych; Brandon Ivey; Matt Hughes; Joel Taylor<b Chris Chittick; Byron Turk
- Opening theme: "Blaze of Glory" by Bon Jovi (season 3–4)
- Composer: Didier Rachou
- Country of origin: United States
- Original language: English
- No. of seasons: 5
- No. of episodes: 36 (list of episodes)

Production
- Executive producers: Charlie Corwin; Brian Nashel; Ronan Nagle; Jay Peterson
- Production location: United States
- Running time: 45 minutes
- Production company: Original Media

Original release
- Network: Discovery Channel
- Release: October 17, 2007 – November 10, 2011

Related
- Tornado Intercept (2005) on the National Geographic Channel; The Science of Storm Chasing (2007) on the Science Channel

Storm Chasers is an American documentary reality television series that premiered on October 17, 2007, on the Discovery Channel. Produced by Original Media, the program follows several teams of storm chasers as they attempt to intercept tornadoes in Tornado Alley in the United States. The show was canceled at the end of its 5th season by Discovery Communications on January 21, 2012.

== Overview ==
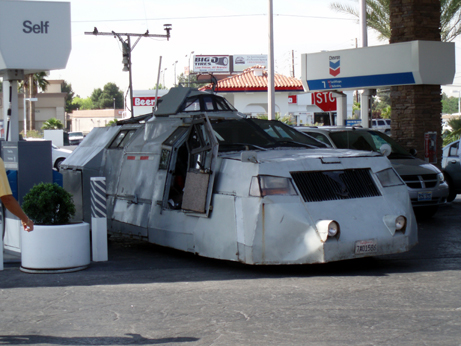
An early version of the Tornado Intercept Vehicle (TIV 1).

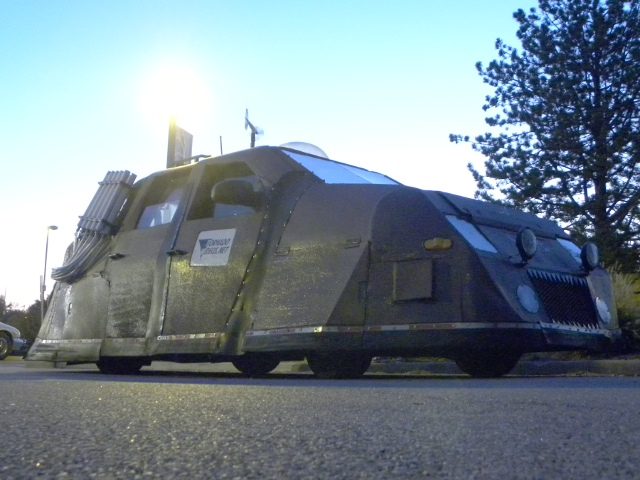
The SRV "Dominator", featured in the Discovery Channel series, Storm Chasers.

Storm Chasers was filmed each year in the central United States (an area known as Tornado Alley due to the frequency and severity of tornadoes occurring there) primarily during late spring and early summer, the time of the most frequent tornado activity (though some episodes of recent seasons have also been filmed in the lesser-known Dixie Alley in the southeastern U.S.). Several teams of storm chasers appear in the series. During the 2007 and 2008 seasons Dr. Joshua Wurman, a renowned atmospheric scientist and creator of the Doppler On Wheels (DOW), teamed with documentary IMAX filmmaker Sean Casey. Wurman's goal is to collect tornado data in order to improve warnings systems, while Casey's goal is to film footage inside a tornado using his armored Tornado Intercept Vehicle (TIV).

The TIV crew was led by Casey and Marcus Gutierrez, Driver and rescue Medic who took over Ronan's job as driver of the series, and Byron Turk, navigator and a shooter/producer for the show. The TIV was outfitted with weather instruments which collect data from approximately 12 feet above ground that, when combined with the DOW radar imagery and the probe data, can help to give Josh a more complete picture of a tornado's structure. Casey produced/directed his second IMAX feature about tornadoes. The first, Forces of Nature, was released in 2003 with a third of the film dedicated to tornadoes, the other two thirds were dedicated to volcanoes and earthquakes. Ronan is an executive producer on the film entitled, Tornado Alley, with the release on March 18, 2011.

Beginning in 2008, the program also began following the team from the website TornadoVideos.Net (TVN) led by meteorology Ph.D. candidate Reed Timmer, Joel Taylor (Driver/Meteorologist) and Chris Chittick (Photographer/Probe Technician). The goal of Reed's small but highly mobile team is to capture "extreme video" as well as scientific data from tornadoes. Timmer's team is known as "Team Dominator" in the show, referring to the name of their own armored chase vehicle, the SRV Dominator. This new season also brought a change to Casey's team, replacing the TIV with the TIV2. The vehicle suffered constant chronic mechanical problems, and was sent for re-modification early in the season, and was replaced with the original TIV. TIV2 did not return from repairs until the middle of the third season.

During the 2009 season, the series also documented the TWISTEX team, led by engineer and veteran storm chaser Tim Samaras, who was killed in 2013 while chasing a tornado near El Reno, Oklahoma along with his son Paul and fellow storm chaser Carl Young. The main purpose of the TWISTEX team is to deploy their "turtle" probes into the path of tornadoes and deploy mesonet vehicles around the twister. Carl Young helps pilot the Probe vehicle while Tony Laubach drives one of the mesonet vehicles, M3. Another addition to Casey's team was the addition of the Doghouse, driven by meteorologists and storm chasers Matt Hughes (died 2010) and Brandon Ivey, who chased as part of the TIV team. The original Scout, PROBE, TWISTEX, and TVN vehicles all carry probes that are designed to be placed in the projected path of tornadoes to collect data and film footage from the lowest 100 feet of the tornado.

Before the beginning of the 2009 season, Josh Wurman become one of the leaders of Vortex 2, a government sponsored tornado research program, which led to massive cast changes. The DOW, Scout, Probe vehicles, along with all personnel except Casey, Turk and Neagle leaving the show's main cast. Vortex 2, Josh Wurman and some of the other cast reappeared in several episodes across Seasons 3 and 4.

=== Dedications ===
The episode titled "Dedication" which debuted on November 3, 2010, begins and ends with a dedication to Wichita native Matt Hughes, who had attempted suicide on May 14, 2010 and died twelve days later at age thirty in Valley Center, Kansas. Matt was part of the TIV team, first in the Doghouse and then, in 2010, inside the TIV under Casey's direction. Casey's completed IMAX film Tornado Alley (opened in March 2011) is dedicated to Hughes. The 2010 season is dedicated to Yazoo City, Mississippi as TornadoVideos.Net chased the mile-wide tornado and were among the first people on the scene to help.

== Episodes ==
Season	Episodes	Season premiere	Season finale
1	4	October 17, 2007	November 7, 2007
2	8	October 19, 2008	December 7, 2008
3	8	October 18, 2009	November 29, 2009
4	8	October 13, 2010	December 1, 2010
5	8	September 25, 2011	November 10, 2011

== Chasing groups featured ==
DOW and Scout were headed by Dr. Wurman in seasons one and two. Wurman and the DOW made only sporadic appearances in seasons three and four, as they had joined the VORTEX2 project, which is not generally followed by Storm Chasers cameras. In season four, Dr. Wurman was also shown to be involved in the funding of Casey's IMAX film, when he addressed Casey about a video showing reckless driving by TIV2. The Scout team of Danny Cheresnick and Aaron Ruppert appeared in the first two seasons as part of the DOW team, but were featured in only one episode in season three.

Chasing groups	Season 1	Season 2	Season 3	Season 4	Season 5
Tornado Intercept Vehicle	Main				
Doppler on Wheels	Main		Recurring		
TornadoVideos.Net	Cameo	Main			
TWISTEX			Main		

== Cancellation ==
On January 21, 2012, Tim Samaras and Sean Casey confirmed on their Facebook pages that Storm Chasers was cancelled by Discovery Communications. Tim Samaras was reportedly relieved when the show was cancelled as he thought it focused more on interpersonal drama than on the storms themselves.

== Broadcast ==
Repeats of the series are currently airing on the digital broadcast network Quest. Episodes of all 5 seasons are also available on YouTube and the first 2 seasons are available on HBO Max.

== After the series ==
Timmer and others continued a web series, Tornado Chasers, funded by Kickstarter campaigns.

On May 31, 2013, three members of the TWISTEX team, Tim Samaras, his twenty-four-year-old son Paul Samaras, and California native Carl Young (aged 45), lost their lives while chasing an EF3 tornado near El Reno, Oklahoma. The three were featured in a Storm Chasers special, "Mile Wide Tornado: Oklahoma Disaster", which aired on The Discovery Channel on June 5, 2013. They were also featured in The Weather Channel's television special "Dangerous Day Ahead", which aired a month later.

On February 4, 2016, Herbert Stein (former driver of the Doppler on Wheels) died at age 57 from pancreatic and liver cancer.

On January 23, 2018, former Storm Chasers member Joel Taylor died of a drug overdose at age 38 on a cruise ship.

== In other media ==
Storm Chasers Sean Casey and Reed Timmer appeared on an episode of the MythBusters. They had the TIV 2 and the Dominator tested by MythBusters Adam Savage and Jamie Hyneman to see if the vehicles could withstand wind speeds of 200 to 250 mph using a high powered jet engine. (See Storm Chasing Myths.)

== See also ==
- List of programs broadcast by Discovery Channel
- The Weather Channel
