= Tony Laubach =

American meteorologist (born 1980)

- Born: November 20, 1980 (age 45); Oxnard, California, United States
- Education: Southern Illinois University (M.S., 2016), Metropolitan State College of Denver (B.S., 2009)
- Known for: Storm chasing, meteorology
- Scientific career
- Fields: Meteorology, technical communication, professional media and media management studies
- Workplaces: KAKE-TV, WSIL-TV, KMGH-TV, AccuWeather

Tony Laubach (/ˈlɔːbæk/ LAW-bak; born November 20, 1980) is an American storm chaser and meteorologist. He has participated in several field research projects and is one of the former members of TWISTEX. He has been contracted as a severe weather photojournalist for various major television networks, and has starred in several television shows, including Seasons 3 through 5 of Storm Chasers on the Discovery Channel.

Laubach is a field Meteorologist, storm chaser, and multimedia journalist for The AccuWeather Network. Laubach made his debut on the network on June 7, 2021 after witnessing a tornado from their new house the day they closed. On August 9 in northern Illinois, Laubach aired the Sycamore, IL tornado live on the network in the middle of a tornado outbreak.

Laubach was the weekend morning meteorologist and storm chaser for KAKE-TV in Wichita, Kansas. He joined the team on March 19, 2018 and debuted on-air a week later on March 25. Three years later on March 25, 2021, Laubach announced on his Facebook page that he was leaving KAKE with his last day being May 2. Prior to KAKE, Laubach worked for nearly five years as a meteorologist and the "Weather Warrior" for WSIL-TV in Carterville, Illinois. He worked at WSIL from July 31, 2013 until March 11, 2018. Prior to that, Laubach was the primary storm chaser and a weather producer at KMGH, 7News in Denver, Colorado.

At WSIL, Laubach created and produced a nine-part segment that aired every Wednesday from May 3 to July 8, 2015 called "Weather Warrior Wednesday". This weekly package detailed his storm chasing, and he produced it from the field. He did a second season of the "Weather Warrior" segment in 2016, which aired from May 4 to July 13, and featured eight packages and two narratives. In August 2016, Laubach debuted as a broadcast meteorologist, filling in to do weathercasts on weekend mornings. He was promoted to full-time weekend mornings starting on September 3, 2017. He created another storm chasing segment called "Storm Story Sunday", which featured highlights of his storm-chasing career and aired every Sunday for his tenure as the full-time weekend meteorologist. His final "Storm Story Sunday" aired on March 4, 2018 and included his official announcement that he was leaving WSIL to pursue his career in Kansas.

Laubach was the contributing producer, a videographers, and featured talent in KMGH 7News's 2011 television news special, "Tracking Twisters". The special was named "Best Single Program Including News Magazine Programs" in 2011 by the Colorado Broadcast Association, and received a 2012 regional Emmy award from the National Television Academy Heartland Chapter for "Magazine Program/Weather Program".

Laubach's images and footage have been used by networks and programs including CNN, ABC News, Good Morning America, Fox News, The Weather Channel, The National Geographic Channel, The Discovery Channel, The Travel Channel, Associated Press, Univision, Women's Entertainment, and local media news outlets nationwide.

In July 2017, The Scioto Post named Laubach as the 10th most famous person from Pickaway County, Ohio, owing to his well publicized storm-chasing career.

== Education ==
Prior to college, he graduated high school in 1999 from John F Kennedy High School in Denver, Colorado after relocating from Ohio where he attended Circleville High School in Circleville, Ohio.

In 2016 he earned a Master's of Science in Professional Media and Media Management Studies, with a concentration in New Media and Journalism, from Southern Illinois University, Carbondale, Illinois. In 2009, he earned a Bachelor's of Science in Meteorology and Technical Communications, with a minor in Mathematics and a concentration in Interactive Media, from Metropolitan State University, Denver, Colorado.

== Storm chase career ==
Laubach's first chase was in May 1997 where he documented a small tornado near Clarksburg, Ohio. After moving to Colorado, he began his professional career in 2002 and has since been featured on several television specials, with his video work appearing nationally across various major networks.

From 2007 through 2011, Laubach was a permanent participant in the field research project TWISTEX, headed up by engineer Tim Samaras. He was in charge of operations in a mesonet vehicle, taking measurements of RFD in supercell and tornado-producing storms. From 2009 through 2011, he was part featured on Storm Chasers.

In 2008, Laubach took part in the filming of shows for the National Geographic Channel and Women's Entertainment, both shows airing in early/mid-2009. In 2011, he was part of the filming for the KMGH special "Tracking Twisters", airing in July 2011.

On May 24, 2011, Laubach saw his 200th career tornado in Fairview, Oklahoma.

In 2012, he returned to solo chasing.

On May 31, 2013, Laubach documented the largest tornado on record near El Reno, Oklahoma. That tornado took the lives of his fellow TWISTEX teammates Tim Samaras, Paul Samaras, and Carl Young of South Lake Tahoe, California. Laubach escaped the storm by less than a minute early in its life-cycle as it was quickly growing to its record width and was three miles south of his TWISTEX teammates when the storm struck them.

On May 24, 2016, near Dodge City, Kansas, Laubach saw his 300th career tornado.

On August 8, 2021, Laubach broke his Iowa curse, documenting his first confirmed tornado in the state of his career.

On August 16, 2021, Laubach chased his first tropical storm, Fred in Florida. Two weeks later on August 29, he chased his first hurricane, Category 4 Ida, in Louisiana.

== Credited television appearances ==
- Twister Sisters - Episode 6, Women's Entertainment (aired January 15, 2009)
- Disaster Labs - "Into the Tornado", National Geographic Channel (aired May 14, 2009)
- Storm Chasers - Ep. 13, "Storm Catchers", Discovery Channel (aired October 18, 2009)
- Storm Chasers - Ep. 14, "Bigger In Texas", Discovery Channel (aired October 25, 2009)
- Storm Chasers - Ep. 16, "Inside The Tornado", Discovery Channel (aired November 8, 2009)
- Storm Chasers - Ep. 17, "Not In Kansas Anymore", Discovery Channel (aired November 15, 2009)
- Storm Chasers - Ep. 19, "Sean Casey At The Bat", Discovery Channel (aired November 29, 2009)
- Storm Chasers - Ep. 20, "EF-3 Strikes You're Out", Discovery Channel (aired November 29, 2009)
- Storm Chasers - Ep. 21, "What Goes Around", Discovery Channel (aired October 13, 2010)
- Storm Chasers - Storm Chasers 2010 Greatest Storms, Discovery Channel (aired October 14, 2010)
- Storm Chasers - Ep. 22, "Why We Chase", Discovery Channel (aired October 20, 2010)
- Storm Chasers - Ep. 24, "Dedication", Discovery Channel (aired November 3, 2010)
- Storm Chasers - Ep. 25, "Smoke Monster", Discovery Channel (aired November 10, 2010)
- Storm Chasers - Ep. 26, "Perfect Storm", Discovery Channel (aired November 17, 2010)
- Storm Chasers - Ep. 27, "Twilight Zone", Discovery Channel (aired November 24, 2010)
- Storm Chasers - Ep. 28, "Judgment Day", Discovery Channel (aired December 1, 2010)
- Storm Chasers - Behind The Storms, Discovery Channel (aired December 8, 2010)
- "Tracking Twisters" - KMGH ABC 7News (aired July 31, 2011), also credited as photographer
- Storm Stories, The Next Chapter - Ep. 1, "Twin Twisters", The Weather Channel (aired August 8, 2019)
- In the Eye of the Storm - S4E1, "Nightmare in May", Discovery Channel (aired June 28, 2026)

Laubach was featured in the opening credits of Storm Chasers in season 5, but never appeared in an episode.

== Awards ==
- National Storm Chaser Summit, 2024 "Photo of the Year" (Akron, CO Twin Tornadoes)
- National Storm Chaser Summit, 2024 "Video of the Year" (Akron, CO Multiple Tornado Sequence)
- Kansas Association of Broadcasters (KAB) First Place, 2019 "Weathercast: Severe Weather Alert Day" (won with Meteorologists Jay Prater and Cat Taylor)
- National Television Academy Heartland Chapter Regional Emmy Nomination, 2019 "Talent, Weather Anchor"
- National Television Academy Heartland Chapter Regional Emmy Award, 2012 "Magazine Program/Weather Program" for "Tracking Twisters" (contributing producer/videographer/featured talent)
- Colorado Broadcast Association, 2011 "Best Single Program Including News Magazine Programs" for "Tracking Twisters" (contributing producer/videographer/featured talent)
- Weatherwise, 2012 photo contest, third prize, for "The sun sets through a supercell featuring arc clouds and a banded underside of an anvil cloud, photographed near Tryon, Nebraska, on August 17, 2011".
- Weatherwise, 2012 photo contest, honorable mention, for "The sun sets at the end of a stormy day near Pratt, Kansas, on May 20, 2011"
- 303 Magazine, 2009 "Odd Job of the Year" Award

== Academic publications ==
- 2012/03/01 - Continuous Upper Air Profiling Near an EF3 Tornado
- 2008/10/27 - TWISTEX 2008: In situ and mobile mesonet observations of tornadoes
