= SRV Dominator =

Series of vehicles designed to intercept tornados

SRV Dominator 1

Overview
- Designer: Reed Timmer, Kevin Barton, Terry Rosema

Body and chassis
- Class: First Generation Storm Research Vehicle
- Layout: 4-wheel drive

Powertrain
- Engine: General Motors LS based small-block V-8, gasoline
- Transmission: Automatic

Dimensions
- Curb weight: 8,000 lb (3,600 kg)

Chronology
- Predecessor: Stock 2007 Chevrolet Tahoe SUV

The three-generation storm research vehicles next to each other. Taken during KFOR's 2013 severe weather coverage. From right to left: Dominator 1, Dominator 3, Dominator 2.

The Dominator, also known as the Storm Research Vehicle is a series of tornado interceptors owned, operated, and maintained by meteorologist Reed Timmer, with funding partially provided by AccuWeather and the Discovery Channel. The Dominator Series consists of the Dominator 1, a modified 2007 Chevrolet Tahoe, the Dominator 2, a modified 2011 GMC Yukon XL, the Dominator 3, a modified 2012 Ford F-350 Super Duty, Dominator Fore, a name utilized by three different stock Subaru Foresters, and Dominator F-150, a Stock Ford F-150. In Late October of 2026, Reed Timmer announced that all three Dominators will be getting repairs during the off season of 2026 into 2027, with Dominator 1 already starting to get repairs.

== Dominator 1 ==
Dominator 1 was modified from a 2007 Chevrolet Tahoe that was used during the 2008 storm chasing season and debuted in the 2009 chase season. The modifications included adding bulletproof sheet metal and transparent Lexan armor to protect against flying debris near tornadoes, and an external roll cage and racing-style safety harnesses in case of a vehicle roll. Dominator 1 is designed to intercept (due mainly to a lack of an anchoring system as employed on the TIV 2) but is able to get as close as "humanly possible" to tornadoes. Dominator 1 can survive winds of up to 170 mph (273.6 kph), and has intercepted winds of up to 155.3 mph, where it only slid. In 2009, a tornado in Aurora, Nebraska unexpectedly strengthened right over Dominator 1 and blew out the driver's window, when its exterior Lexan window failed to roll up. Reed Timmer and one of his passengers suffered lacerations to the face from flying glass.

During the 2009 off-season, Dominator 1 was upgraded by strengthening bulletproof and LINE-X sheet metal and Lexan windows. Further upgrades added mid-season include a vertically-scanning radar (Starlink) intended to profile the winds at different heights within a tornado, as well as compressed-air launchers intended to launch wireless parachute probes to gather and transmit data on tornadoes to a chase. At the end of the 2010 season, Dominator 1 slid while intercepting a mile wide EF4 tornado in Wadena, Minnesota, nearly ending in a disaster. Early in the 2011 storm season, Dominator 1 suffered various mechanical issues, such as the four-wheel drive not working, the Lexan on the drivers side not fully closing, near-total brake failure, and hydraulic system failure. These issues were later fixed.

In 2018, Dominator 1 was left in the parking lot of Tornado Safe, an Oklahoma City company that built storm shelters. In 2020 Timmer took a picture of the Dominator 1 with the Dominator 2. In 2022, after many years of sitting, Timmer was able to get Dominator 1 running and was able to drive it to a new storage location. Dominator 1 had suffered damage sustained from sitting such as faded Lexan windows, Reed losing the keys and other various repairs needed. Dominator 1 was put into service for a limited amount of storm chasing during the 2023 season. In October 2026, Timmer announced additional plans to return all three of the modified Dominators to service. After replacing the starter, Dominator 1 was able to move under its own power. Dominator 1 had suffered damage from a fire that occurred while welding was being done on the vehicle, and would need extensive rewiring to be done as a result of the fire and from rodents chewing the wiring. Timmer also stated that Dominator 1's hydraulic system would need to be repaired and all the protective windows would need to be replaced.

== Dominator 2 ==
SRV Dominator 2

Overview
- Designer: Reed Timmer, Kevin Barton

Body and chassis
- Class: Second Generation Storm Research Vehicle
- Layout: 4-Wheel Drive

Powertrain
- Engine: GM LS based small block V-8, E85
- Transmission: Automatic Transmission

Dimensions
- Curb weight: 10,000 lbs (4,500 kg)

Chronology
- Predecessor: Stock 2011 Yukon XL

In early 2011, Reed Timmer and other members of TVN, purchased a 2011 GMC Yukon XL, which would be the base for a second Dominator vehicle named Dominator 2. Changes from Dominator 1 are said to include a flex fuel engine, improved aerodynamic streamlining thanks to the fully sealed outer shell, higher ride height, swiveling rear passenger seats, improved hydraulics, wider wheel base and upgraded armor protection as well as anchoring spikes that could allow it to engage tornadoes stronger than those Dominator 1 could safely face. Reed Timmer also stated that both vehicles would be used, with one going into tornadoes to gather data from inside the funnel while the other would collect data from just outside, allowing them to compare the two sets of data. Dominator 2 features reinforced sheet metal and transparent Lexan, and has been strengthened with higher-quality steel and an additional LINE-X coating. This shell is firmly affixed to the frame and chassis of the GMC Yukon XL. Dominator 2 retains a roll cage and racing-car safety seats with full-torso harnesses for added crew protection.

Dominator 2 first saw action during the tornado outbreak sequence of May 21–26, 2011 in central Oklahoma, shown on the fifth season of Storm Chasers.

On May 31, 2013, Dominator 2 was damaged removing its hood when it intercepted a record breaking multiple-vortex tornado near El Reno. According to KFOR-TV, posts by Reed on Facebook, and as shown in Season 2, episodes 11 and 12 of Tornado Chasers, the hood was ripped off of the vehicle when the Dominator 2 collided with a downed power line. The tornado would go on to be 2.6 miles (4.2 km) wide with winds measured by radar exceeding 312 mph (502 km/h), Unofficially windspeeds are measured by radar at 336 mph (541 km/h) (at about 100 m (330 ft) above the surface), making this the largest and strongest tornado ever intercepted by any of the Dominator vehicles. During the chase, Reed and his team found the wrecked SUV of Mike Bettes and his team from The Weather Channel's Great Tornado Hunt after it had been rolled into a field by a sub-vortex from the main tornado. Joined by members from Oklahoma City's KFOR-TV Channel 4 storm chasing team such as Emily Sutton, and first responders like the Oklahoma Highway Patrol, Bettes and his crew were rescued and evacuated to receive medical attention. Reed later learned that TWISTEX founder Tim Samaras, his son Paul, and storm chasing partner Carl Young, were fatalities of the El Reno tornado.

Dominator 2 sustained engine damage during a storm chase and was parked in a storage lot in Norman, where it sat for many years. In 2022, Timmer made plans to get Dominator 2 back on the road. Dominator 2 needed to be towed to the new warehouse.

On May 19, 2026, Dominator 3 would suffer a severe engine failure, which caused Team Dominator to begin attempts of repairing Dominator 2 for storm chasing, after 9 years of being inoperable. Will Clay, a member of the SRV Dominator team, stated that rats or similar animals had chewed through the wiring harness on the vehicle, suggesting that work to repair the vehicle after sitting for several years is somewhat extensive. In October 2026, Timmer posted a video to Facebook announcing plans to return Dominator 2 to service. Timmer stated that Dominator 2 would need a new engine and a new wiring harness, and would need to have all of its protective windows replaced. Dominator 2 can survive winds of up to 195MPH (313.8KPH), and has been in winds up to 150-155MPH (241.4KPH-249.4KPH).

== Dominator 3 ==
SRV Dominator 3

Overview
- Designer: Reed Timmer, Kevin Barton, Sean Schofer

Body and chassis
- Class: Third Generation Storm Research Vehicle
- Layout: 4-Wheel Drive with Locking Rear Differential.

Powertrain
- Engine: 6.7-liter Turbodiesel Powerstroke V8, diesel
- Transmission: Automatic Transmission

Dimensions
- Curb weight: 13,000 lbs (~5896.7 kg)

Chronology
- Predecessor: Stock 2012 Ford F-350 Super Duty Crew Cab SRW

A third Dominator vehicle was completed in late April 2013. This vehicle, named Dominator 3, was built using a 2012 Ford F-350 Super Duty pickup truck as the base vehicle — the first Dominator vehicle not to use a General Motors vehicle as the base. The vehicle features an electric winch, airbag lowering suspension, hydraulic anchoring spikes, and gull-wing doors (which were augmented with touch-activated actuators in early 2014) for the driver, front and rear passengers. It is also the first Dominator vehicle to utilize a diesel powerplant.

Dominator 3 first saw action during the tornado outbreak of May 18–21, 2013, making three separate intercepts on an EF4 tornado near Shawnee, Oklahoma on May 19.

On May 28, 2019, Dominator 3 was utilized to launch the first "Dorothy" probe rocket into an EF4 tornado nearby Lawrence, Kansas with the probe being the first to successfully pierce the sheet of sinking air that surrounds a tornado. The probe went as high as 34,000 feet with data transmitting for around 8 minutes before signal was lost. The probe, named "Bill Paxton", was recovered 3 days later with the complete data set recovered.

Dominator 3 successfully intercepted an EF1 Tornado near Spalding, Nebraska on May 12th, 2023.

On May 31, 2024, the Dominator 3 hit a large deer while driving in Texas, causing structural damage and a radiator leak.

After the 2024 season, Dominator 3 experienced total brake failure. An auto service shop stated that the pads and rotors needed to be replaced as well as an entire rebuild of the brake system. The vehicle was put back in service in time for the 2025 season.

On June 30, 2025, while driving back to Oklahoma after a chase, Dominator 3 once again struck a deer. This damaged the headlight Lexan and the metal sheeting was pushed in.

On February 13, 2026, Timmer announced the completed rebuild. Dubbed Dominator 3.2, the upgrades to the interceptor included a new, strengthened hood to prevent damage from debris and animal strike incidents with some additional small changes to the forward lighting arrangement. The rebuild was completed by Lewis Fabrications out of Perkins, Oklahoma.

On April 22, 2026, the Dominator 3 would suffer spike damage grinding the tip to a nub, and underwent roadside repairs. The day after, it was caught in the Braman, Oklahoma preliminary EF1 tornado and slid into a field.

On May 20, 2026, Timmer confirmed that the Dominator 3 had suffered a motor failure, grounding it for the rest of the May tornado season. On May 28, 2026, Timmer announced on his social media that he, along with Jakes Custom Diesel and S&S Diesel Motor Sport, were in the process of swapping the blown engine for a new crate motor in time for the June storm season. On June 9, 2026, Timmer announced on his social media that the Dominator 3 now had a new engine. On June 11, 2026, Timmer announced that Dominator 3 had a fuel pump issue near Kirksville, MO, but Will Clay repaired it before a tornado outbreak occurred. The Dominator 3 can survive winds of up to 210MPH (338 KPH) and has been in winds of up to 163MPH (262.3KPH), possibly up to 200MPH (321.9KPH), and in the 200MPH one, it slid 360-460 degrees.

== Dominator Fore ==
SRV Dominator Fore

Overview
- Designer: Reed Timmer

Body and chassis
- Class: Fourth Generation Storm Research Vehicle
- Layout: 4-Wheel Drive.

Powertrain
- Engine: Subaru 2.5 L FB25 H4
- Transmission: Automatic Transmission

Dimensions
- Curb weight: 3,717 Lbs

Chronology
- Predecessor: Stock 2018 Subaru Forester 2.0 XT, Stock 2016 Subaru Forester PEZV 2.5i
- Successor: Stock 2015 Subaru Forester

Dominator Fore was a Subaru Forester. The Dominator Fore was a stock vehicle, unlike Timmer's other storm-chasing vehicles, which are heavily fortified trucks. Timmer had said that the Forester was a good choice for certain situations due to its smaller size and maneuverability. This allowed him to navigate tight spaces and avoid debris during storms. While not specifically built for the purpose like Timmer's other Dominator vehicles, the Subaru took its fair share of punishment over the years. Timmer documented the car's many dents and dings sustained while chasing storms, including hail damage and encounters with tornadoes. In September 2022, the original Dominator Fore was caught in the storm surge of Hurricane Ian and left battered and non-functional. In December 2022, Timmer purchased a 2016 Subaru Forester 2.5i as a replacement Dominator Fore. Timmer swapped the hood from the original Dominator Fore onto the replacement vehicle in honor of the original Dominator Fore. In June 2024, while chasing a tornado in Texas, the engine on the replacement Dominator Fore seized up, and the vehicle was subsequently scrapped. In October 2024, Timmer purchased a 2015 Subaru Forester, which he referred to as "Dominator 4.5" in social media posts. This third iteration of the Dominator Fore was totaled in November 2025 from damages sustained when Timmer hit a deer while traveling in Texas.

== Dominator F-150 ==
Dominator F-150 is a stock 2025 Ford F-150. Timmer acquired Dominator F-150 in December 2025 as a replacement for Dominator Fore.

== Dominator 5 ==
In July 2024, Timmer announced plans to construct Dominator 5. Timmer stated that Jake's Custom Diesel out of Norman, Oklahoma would be spearheading the build.

== See also ==
- Tornado Intercept Vehicle
- TWISTEX
- Reed Timmer
- TIV 1
- Tornado
- May 2011 tornado outbreak
