= Tornado Intercept Vehicle =

Vehicle used to film a tornado

The Tornado Intercept Vehicle 1 (TIV 1) and Tornado Intercept Vehicle 2 (TIV 2) are vehicles used to film with an IMAX camera from very close distance or within a tornado. They were designed by film director Sean Casey. Both TIVs have "intercepted" numerous tornadoes, including the June 12, 2005, Jayton, Texas tornado, the June 5, 2009, Goshen County, Wyoming tornado, and the strongest intercept, done by the TIV 2, the May 27, 2013, Kansas tornado.

== TIV 1 ==
TIV-1
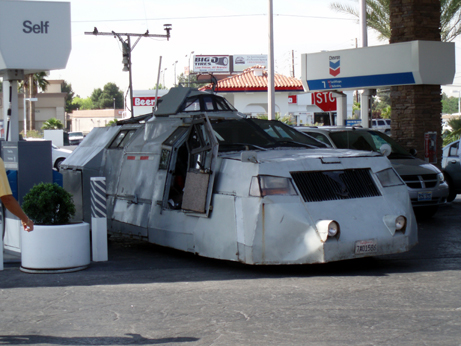
- TIV 1 from 2005 before the addition of stabilizing claws.

Overview
- Designer: Sean Casey

Body and chassis
- Class: first-generation storm research vehicle
- Body style: modified 1997 Ford F 450-Super Duty cab and chassis
- Layout: 2 wheel drive, 2 axles, 6 wheels

Powertrain
- Engine: 7.3 liter Powerstroke Diesel
- Transmission: ZF 5-speed manual

Dimensions
- Height: 14 feet (4.3 m)
- Curb weight: 14,000 lb (6,400 kg)

The Tornado Intercept Vehicle 1 (TIV 1) is a heavily modified 1997 Ford F-Series F-Super Duty cab & chassis truck used as a storm chasing platform and built by Sean Casey. This heavily armored vehicle can intercept a weak to relatively strong tornado (EF0 to EF3) to film it and take measurements. Work on the TIV 1 began in December 2002 and took about 8 months to complete, at a total cost of about $81,000. TIV's armored shell consists of 1/8–1/4 inch steel plate welded to a two-inch square steel tubing frame. The windows are bullet resistant polycarbonate, measuring 1.5 in (38 mm) thick on the windshield and 0.5 in (13 mm) thick on the sides. The TIV 1 weighs approximately 14,000 lb (6,400 kg) fully loaded and is powered by a 7.3 litre Ford Powerstroke turbocharged diesel engine manufactured by Navistar-International, otherwise known as the Navistar T444E.

Before an intercept the front of the vehicle is angled downwards, and four hydraulic claws are lowered into the ground to stabilize the vehicle. The vehicle's top speed is 80 mph (130 km/h). The TIV 1 has a fuel capacity of 60 US gallons (230 L), giving it a range of around 500 miles (800 km). The TIV 1 is featured in a series called Storm Chasers which began airing on the Discovery Channel in October 2007. TIV 1 was succeeded in 2008 by TIV 2, but returned to service to finish out the first few chases of the 2008 storm chasing season after TIV 2 suffered mechanical problems. In a June 2011 interview with NPR's All Things Considered, Casey said that TIV 1 was still in service and is designated as the backup vehicle in the event TIV 2 breaks down during a shoot.

After no longer needing the vehicle, Casey abandoned the vehicle on a central Kansas farm. Casey placed the TIV 1 as a prize for a scavenger hunt, where the first one to find the TIV would be able to keep it. Wichita-based storm chaser Robert Clayton found the vehicle in 2020, after searching for it on Google Earth.

In April 2025, TIV 1 was moved from Augies Repair & Towing in Hays, Kansas and returned to Robert Clayton's possession. Later that month, Clayton began renovating the TIV 1 by sawing off the front bumper, removing the stabilizing claws and a trunk, painting the vehicle black, and making other adjustments to reduce its weight. As of November 2026, Clayton occasionally posts updates on TIV 1 via his TikTok page. TIV-1 can survive winds of up to 165MPH (265.6KPH) and has survived winds of up to 125-150MPH (201.1KPH-241.4KPH).

== TIV 2 ==
Tornado Intercept Vehicle 2
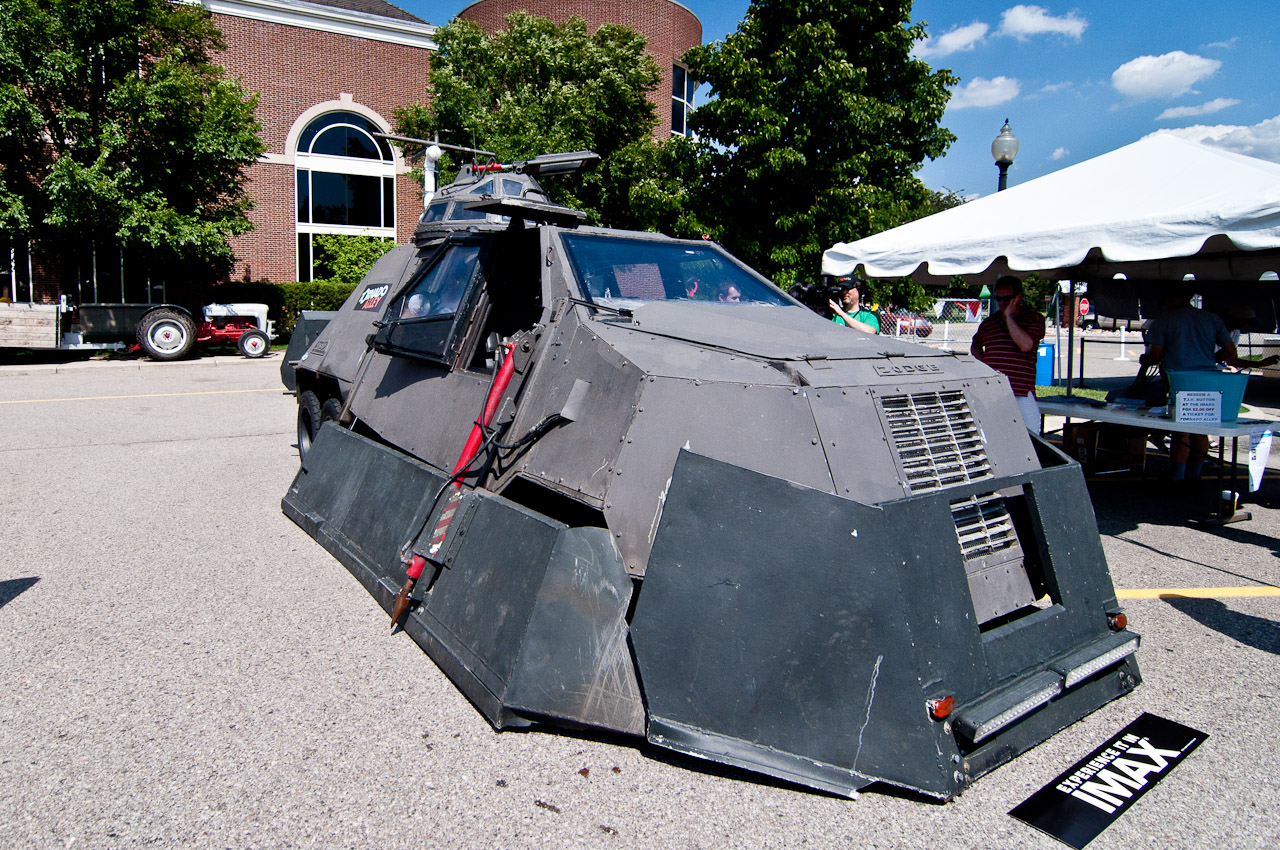
- TIV-2 from 2011

Overview
- Type: Mobile meteorological research and film-production vehicle
- Designer: Sean Casey

Body and chassis
- Class: Second Generation Storm Research Vehicle
- Layout: 6x6 (2008), 6x4 (2009–present), 3 axles, 6 wheels

Powertrain
- Engine: Modified 6.7 Litre Turbocharged Cumming Diesel Engine

Dimensions
- Curb weight: 16,500 lb (7,500 kg) (2008), 14,300 lb (6,500 kg) (2009–present)

In September 2007, Sean Casey and his team created the next Tornado Intercept Vehicle (2), dubbed TIV 2, to be featured in their next IMAX movie and the Storm Chasers series. The construction of the TIV-2 began in the Great Plains Technology Center in Lawton, Oklahoma. Construction was finished around 2008 for storm chase season. The TIV 2 was designed to address some of the problems experienced with the original Tornado Intercept Vehicle, mainly its lack of high ground clearance for off-roading. The TIV-2 also addressed the original lack of four-wheel drive in the TIV-1, and the low top speed it held. The TIV-2 was built on a Dodge Ram 3500 chassis, strengthened with tough and heavy armour, spikes, and more, as well being converted to six-wheel drive with the addition of a third axle.

After season two, the six-wheel drive system was modified to four-wheel drive. It is powered by a 6.7-liter Cummins turbocharged diesel engine, modified with propane and water injection to produce 625 horsepower (466 kW). This gives TIV 2 an estimated top speed of over 100 mph (160 km/h). Its fuel capacity is 92 US Gallons (348 L), giving TIV 2 an approximate range of around 750 miles (1,210 km). The body of TIV 2 is constructed of a 1/8-inch steel skin welded over a 2 in (51 mm) square tubing steel frame. The windows in TIV 2 are all bullet-resistant 1.63 in (41 mm) interlayered polycarbonate sheets and tempered glass. TIV 2 also features an IMAX filming turret similar to the one on the original TIV. TIV 2 has an air suspension system that allows it to be lowered when deployed, so less wind can get under the vehicle. It is also equipped with three hydraulic skirts that lower to deflect wind over the TIV, stabilizing it and protecting the underside from debris. It was also not originally equipped with hydraulic spikes.

TIV 2 debuted on the second season of Storm Chasers, which began airing on the Discovery Channel in October 2008. Its initial performance did not go well, as it was plagued by mechanical failures, including several broken axles, which forced Casey to abandon TIV 2 and return to chasing in the original TIV until TIV 2's issues could be resolved. Despite Discovery Channel showing that TIV 2 was out of commission for the majority of the season, TIV 2 could be seen chasing through to the end of the season, including the May 29, 2008 Kearney, NE tornado, though it was not shown in the series.

In the fall of 2008, TIV 2 received several modifications, primarily aimed at reducing the vehicle's 16,500 lb (7,500 kg) weight. To achieve this, less important areas of TIV 2's armor were converted from steel to aluminum while more vital areas were reinforced with supplemental composite armor consisting of thin layers of steel, Kevlar, polycarbonate, and rubber. In all, the weight reduction measures brought TIV 2's weight down to 14,300 lb (6,500 kg). The safety systems were also improved, with the three front wind flaps consolidated into a single skirt and new hydraulic stabilizing spikes to further enhance stability in high winds. Other modifications included additional doors that provided every seat position with an exit (wind skirts up or down), and a redesigned IMAX turret with 50% more windows. The third axle was disconnected from the drivetrain, thereby changing TIV 2 from a 6×6 to a 6×4. The third axle now acts as a brace for the vehicle's weight.

The TIV 2 appeared again before the halfway point of the third season of Storm Chasers. In between seasons three and four of Storm Chasers, TIV 2 also appeared in an episode of another Discovery Channel series, MythBusters, where in both the TIV 2 and the SRV Dominator vehicle operated by Reed Timmer of TornadoVideos.Net were tested to determine their endurance to storm-force winds by being parked behind a Boeing 747 with the engines at full throttle. When tested at a wind speed of 160 mph (260 km/h), the TIV 2 had the driver's door pulled open, which was due to human error: Casey forgot to lock the door prior to the test. When tested again at 250 mph (400 km/h) (equivalent to an EF5 tornado), the TIV 2 suffered no ill effects other than the anchoring spikes being slightly bent; the Dominator ended up being blown approximately 50 feet (15 m), although it remained upright. TIV 2 would intercept a tornado near La Grange, WY, in 2009, which would be the intercept shot Casey needed for his IMAX film. Future chases in TIV 2 would be for b-roll footage of the TIV 2 and for his new IMAX film.

In 2011, a siren was added to the vehicle to allow the TIV 2 to act as a mobile warning system for civilians in the path of incoming tornadoes, after several incidents earlier that year where the TIV 2 team was unable to effectively warn locals of the imminent danger of the tornadoes they were tracking, especially during the 2011 Super Outbreak. On April 27, 2011, the TIV 2 team intercepted an EF4 tornado that hit near Enterprise, Mississippi. While not in the path but 200 yards from it, he shot the first tornado with his new stereoscopic IMAX camera. Casey removed the rear flap in early 2012 and built a new set of two hydraulic spikes that go into the ground during an intercept.

On May 27, 2013, TIV 2 intercepted a large tornado near Lebanon, Kansas. The vehicle was struck by large debris from a nearby farm and suffered damage to the roof-mounted anemometer and at least two breaches of the crew compartment when the roof hatch and one of the doors were blown open. Before the anemometer was disabled, it recorded winds of 150 to 175 mph (241 to 282 km/h), placing the tornado in the EF3 to EF4 range.

On October 21, 2019, Casey listed the TIV 2 on Craigslist for US$35,000 and it was later sold to storm chaser Ryan Shepard. The TIV 2 was fully restored and back on the road again in the 2021 storm season, where it made multiple close intercepts on June 10 in western North Dakota. It is under sponsorship of Storm of Passion and Live Storm Chasers.

On April 23rd, 2026, TIV 2, under the operation of Storm of Passion, would get a core intercept on the Braman, Oklahoma tornado. The N.W.S. would later rate the tornado EF1. Although it is notable for spawning at least 2 satellite tornadoes, its wildly erratic movement completed at least 2 loops before dissipating. Reed Timmer and the Dominator 3 also intercepted this tornado, but because of damage received from a previous interception, the Dominator slid off the road and became stuck in a field. TIV 2 would come across them and offer assistance, but the Dominator would later have to be retrieved with the help of a tractor.

== Subanator ==
Subanator

Overview
- Designer: Sean Casey

Body and chassis
- Class: Mid-size car (2010)
- Body style: modified 2010 Subaru Outback
- Layout: AWD

Powertrain
- Engine: 3.6 L EZ36 DOHC DAVCS H6
- Transmission: automatic

Dimensions
- Length: 188.2 in (4,780 mm)
- Width: 71.7 in (1,821 mm)
- Height: 65.7 in (1,669 mm)
- Curb weight: 3,658 lb (1,659 kg) (3.6R Limited)

The Subanator (also known as Suba TIV) is a modified 2010 Subaru Outback 3.6R designed to film tornadoes up close. Unlike the previous Tornado Intercept Vehicles, which were fully custom designs, Subanator is based on a stock vehicle and is not intended to go directly into the funnel. The modifications include covering the original plastic body panels with a spray-on bedliner (LINE-X), swapping the windshield and both front windows for armored polycarbonate, installing a hail-guard, and, lastly, adding four spikes for added stability while filming in high winds. During deployment, the front and rear spikes are lowered by a third hydraulic located in between them, and once fully lowered, the spikes dig into the ground and anchor the vehicle.

On March 6, 2023, Sean Casey announced on his Instagram page that his newly purchased Subaru would be converted into a weather chasing platform, with the goal being in less than 30 days. He would begin to post regular updates on the progress of the vehicle with the last one being on March 26, 2023, stating that the last layer of polycarbonate had been finished. While updates directly from Sean stopped, he was regularly spotted chasing in Subanator during the 2023 & 2024 tornado season by other chasers, and was speculated that Sean was involved in gathering footage for the film Twisters. Finally on February 13, 2025, It was confirmed that Sean Casey had sold Subanator to storm chaser Chad Crilley. The Subanator can survive winds of up to 150 miles per hour (240 km/h) or about a mid-level EF3. The base vehicle is a 2010 Subaru Outback 3.6R Limited.

== Instrumentation ==
Although primarily designed to shoot film from near or within tornadoes, the TIVs have at times been outfitted with meteorological instrumentation atop masts to complement the Doppler on Wheels (DOW) radar trucks of the Center for Severe Weather Research run by atmospheric scientist and inventor Joshua Wurman.

== Images ==
TIV 2 during its rebuild

TIV 2 in its final major form

TIV 1 After the addition of stabilizing claws

== See also ==
- SRV Dominator
