= TWISTEX =

Tornado research experiment

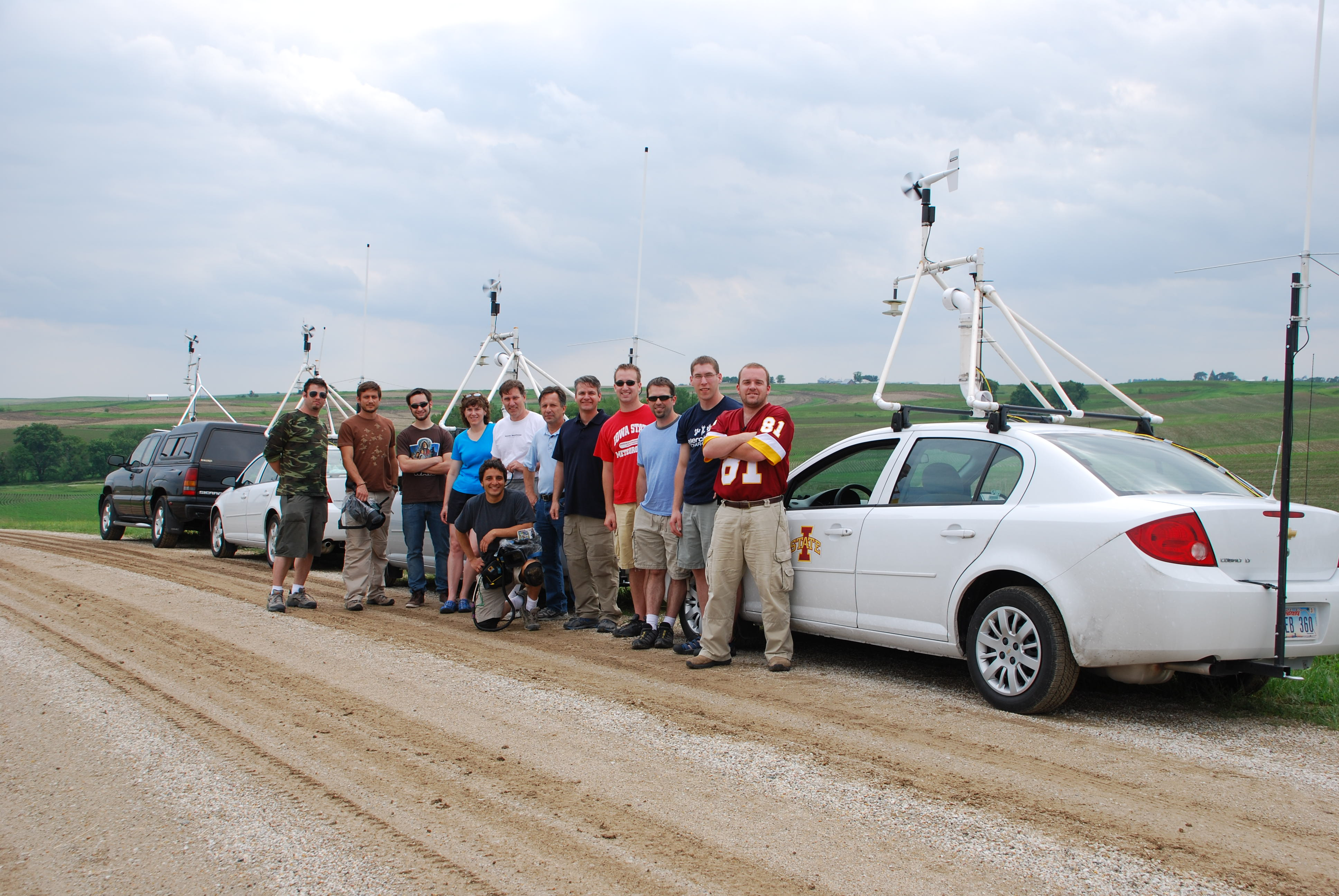
The TWISTEX crew and the vehicles on equipped with mobile mesonets

TWISTEX (an acronym for Tactical Weather-Instrumented Sampling in/near Tornadoes EXperiment) were tornado research field experiments founded and led by Tim Samaras in 2007. The research objectives were to better understand tornado features, tornado maintenance, tornadogenesis and tornado longetivity using in-situ probes that gathered thermodynamic and kinematic datasets at close proximity to tornadoes, and mobile mesonet stations that were mounted on participating vehicles.

The experiment originated in 2003 as Project ANSWERS (an acronym for Analysis of the Near-Surface Wind and Environment Along the Rear Flank of Supercells), a field experiment founded by Cathy Finley and Dr. Bruce Lee, with an objective of gathering Rear Flank Downdraft (RFD) datasets to determine its contribution towards mesocyclogenesis, tornadogenesis, and tornado maintenance. Project ANSWERS operated 4 years before founders Cathy and Bruce helped Tim Samaras to merge their work into TWISTEX in 2007.

TWISTEX was one of the featured teams in seasons 3, 4 and 5 of Storm Chasers on the Discovery Channel, where they worked alongside VORTEX 2. The group was also featured on National Geographic Channel's "Disaster Labs".

== 2013 El Reno tornado ==
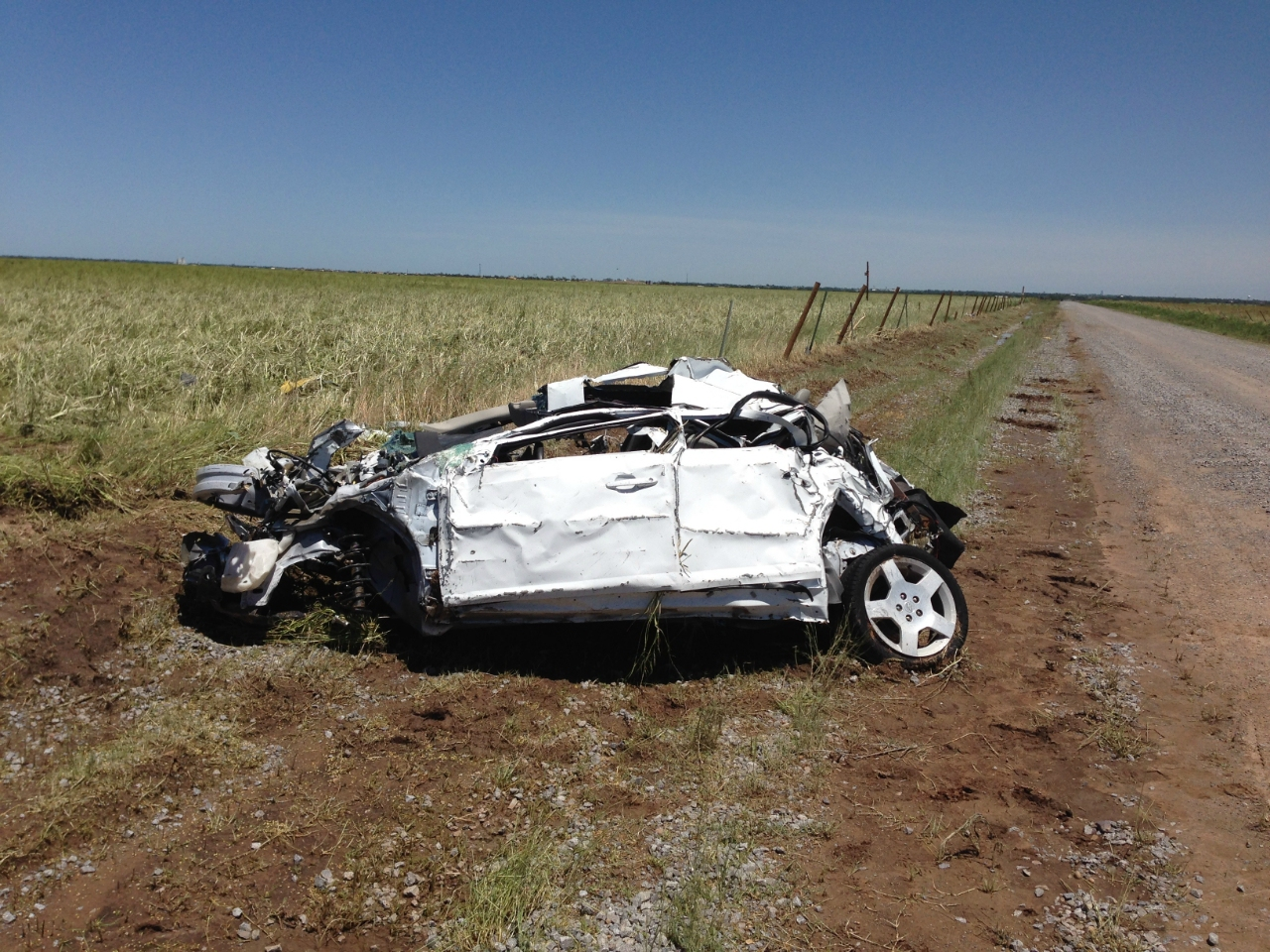
The crushed remains of one of the TWISTEX probe vehicles near the intersection of Reuter Road and S. Radio Road approximately 4.8 mi (7.7 km) southeast of El Reno, Oklahoma

On May 31, 2013, TWISTEX Researchers Tim Samaras, his 24-year-old son Paul Samaras, and 45-year-old California native Carl Young died in the record-breaking 2.6 mile wide EF3 multiple-vortex El Reno tornado. They were unable to escape along gravel roads as the funnel rapidly expanded to envelop them. Their Chevrolet Cobalt vehicle was caught by a subvortex, and Paul and Carl were ejected from the car. Tim was buckled in the passenger's seat, and was killed as the car was thrown around half a mile away by the storm. Hinton resident Richard Henderson, who decided to follow the twister, lost his life in that same area. He snapped a picture of the storm from his cellular phone before it struck him. Several other storm chasers, including The Weather Channel's Mike Bettes, were also caught in the tornado but escaped with only minor injuries. Bettes and the Tornado Hunt crew were lifted up by the tornado in their sport utility vehicle. Four other people who were not involved with storm chasing also died in this tornado.

== TWISTEX personnel ==
Students from the Atmospheric Sciences Department at Iowa State University rotate shifts into the mesonet vehicles during the project. Regularly, there were 10 personnel apart of TWISTEX.

- Tony Laubach; Mesonet Team Leader & Video Archival/Production, Meteorologist
- Matt Grzych; Software & Systems Development, Atmospheric Scientist
- Ed Grubb; Mobile Mesonet Navigator, Mechanical Guru
- Dr. Bruce Lee; Mobile Mesonet Director, Atmospheric Scientist
- Dr. Cathy Finley; Mobile Mesonet Co-director, Atmospheric Scientist
- Chris Karstens; Mesonet Team Leader & Software Development, ISU Atmospheric Sciences Ph.D. Student
- Ben McMillan; Mobile Mesonet Driver, Team Medic
- Tim Samaras; TWISTEX Director, Scientist, Engineer
- Paul Samaras; Videographer, Photographer
- Carl Young; Probe driver, Meteorologist

== Tornado core sampling ==
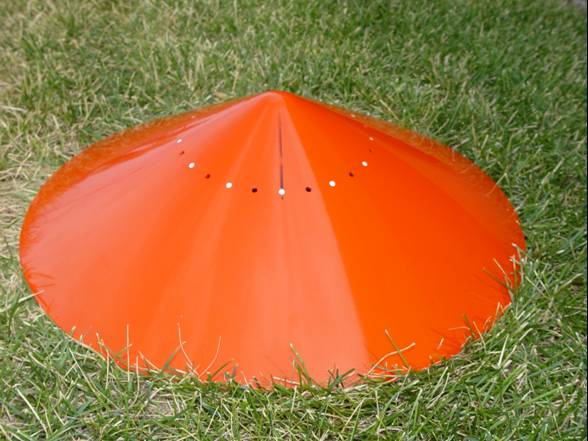
The HITPR probe used to take in-situ tornado measurements.

A primary instrument used by TWISTEX during operations were the Hardened In-situ Tornado Pressure Recorders (HITPR), a thermodynamic probe that would be deployed in the paths of tornadoes to collect datasets of atmospheric pressure, temperature, humidity, wind speed, direction, visualization for accurate debris/hydrometeor velocities and for verification of the tornado-relative location of the in-situ sampling. Measurements were recorded at 10 samples/second when being affected by tornado circulation. They were manufactured highly aerodynamic so it could withstand strong winds without fail.

To provide visualization within the core of tornadic circulation, TWISTEX also had variants of the HITPR probes. These probes utilized 7 cameras each for a total of 14 cameras. The two camera probes were used for photogrammetry purposes to visualize and measure tornado-driven debris. Hydrometeors were also used to track the location of the HITPRs within a tornado.

== Tornado proximity environment sampling ==
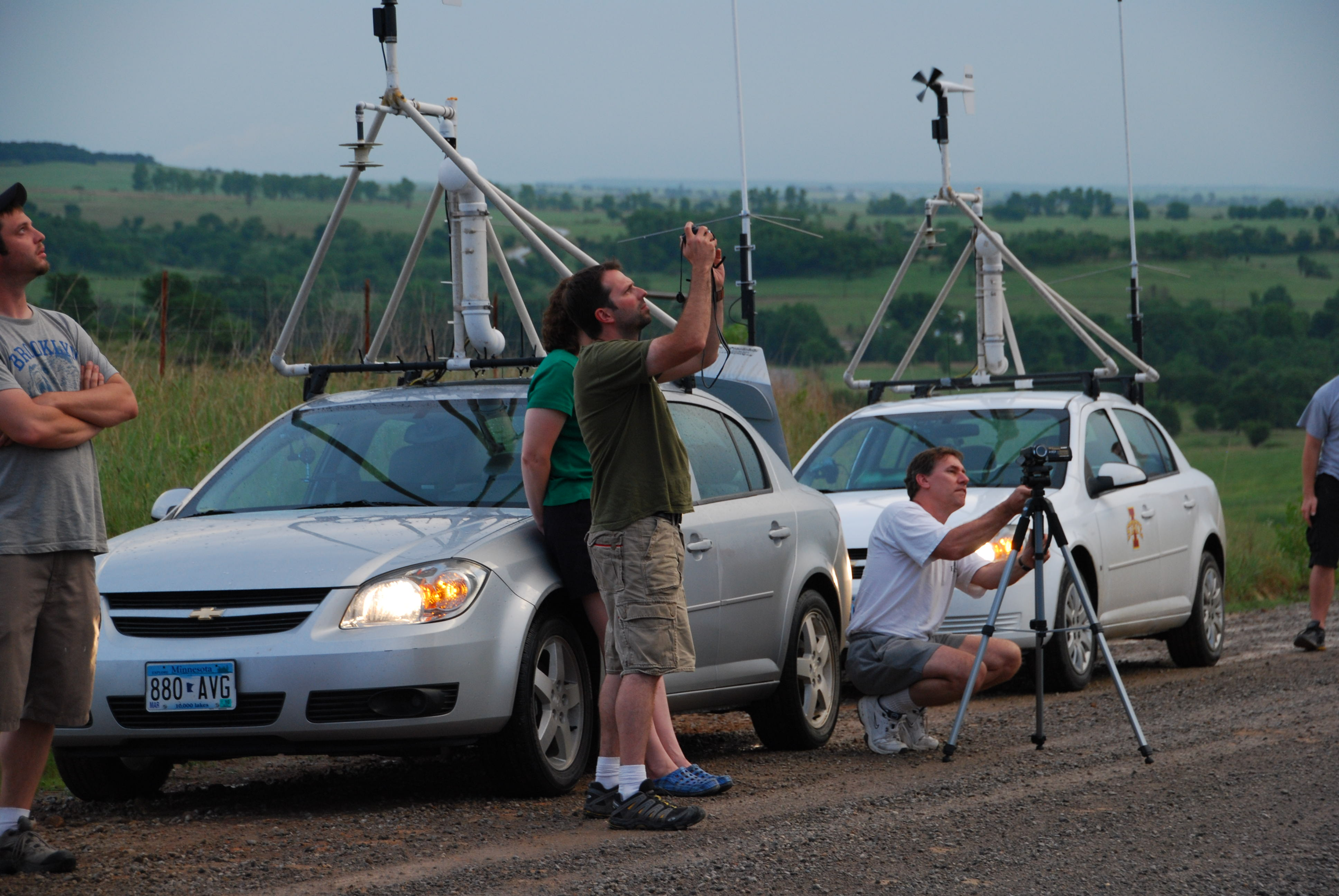
Two of the TWISTEX mesonet vehicles, M1 and M2.

Each of the participating TWISTEX vehicles had a mobile mesonet station mounted on the roof, including probe deployment trucks. The mobile mesonets gathered near-surface thermodynamic and kinematic data within Rear flank downdraft (RFD). When the in-situ probe array data was in use alongside the mobile mesonet stations, it could capture thermodynamic and kinematic mapping that represented the flow reaching the tornado, even if the probes had not been hit head on by a tornado. The TWISTEX fleet included M1, 2, 3, and 4 as their mobile mesonet vehicles.

== Notable TWISTEX Operations ==
During TWISTEX's operation, multiple field experiments occurred annually, with the goal varying each time. TWISTEX's operations usually ended by June, marking the end of Tornado season.

=== TWISTEX 2010 ===
Conducted throughout late May to June 2010, though officially concluding on July 1, 2010, TWISTEX most notably intercepted a large EF4 tornado during the operation.

On May 22, 2010, TWISTEX intercepted a violent multiple-vortex EF4 tornado near Bowdle, South Dakota, during a large tornado outbreak during the later weeks of May. The objective was to determine if Rear Flank Downdraft (RFD) had any contribution to tornadogenesis. TWISTEX used an array of four mobile mesonet vehicles, which sampled atmospheric variables every second. Surges of RFD were reported in datasets across the vehicles, with gusts sampled the most during intensification and dissipation phases of the tornado.

=== TWISTEX 2009 ===
Conducted from May to June 2009, the experiment was assisted by VORTEX 2 and had their debut in Discovery Channel's Storm Chasers.

On June 17, 2009, TWISTEX successfully intercepted an EF2 tornado near Aurora, Nebraska via their thermodynamic HITPR probes. They gathered rare datasets of air parcels within RFD gusts. TWISTEX members afterwards suggested the tornado was likely the best tornado TWISTEX had ever sampled at the time.

== TWISTEX publications ==
Participants of the TWISTEX research project had contributed to many publications.

AMS Journal and Conference Papers

- Karstens, C. D., W. A. Gallus, B. D. Lee, and C. A. Finley, 2013: Analysis of tornado-induced tree-fall using aerial photography from the Joplin, MO, and Tuscaloosa-Birmingham, AL, tornadoes of 2011. J. Appl. Meteorol. Climatol., Early online release: http://journals.ametsoc.org/doi/pdf/10.1175/JAMC-D-12-0206.1
- Lee, B. D., C. A. Finley, and C. D. Karstens, 2012: The Bowdle, South Dakota, cyclic tornadic supercell of 22 May 2010: Surface analysis of rear-flank downdraft evolution and multiple internal surges. Mon. Wea. Rev., 140, 3419–3441. http://journals.ametsoc.org/doi/abs/10.1175/MWR-D-11-00351.1
- Lee, B. D., C. A. Finley, and T. M. Samaras, 2011: Surface analysis near and within the Tipton, Kansas, tornado on 29 May 2008. Mon. Wea. Rev., 139, 370–386. http://journals.ametsoc.org/doi/abs/10.1175/2010MWR3454.1
- Karstens, C. D., T. M. Samaras, B. D. Lee, W. A. Gallus, and C. A. Finley, 2010: Near-ground pressure and wind measurements in tornadoes. Mon. Wea. Rev., 138, 2570–2588. http://journals.ametsoc.org/doi/pdf/10.1175/2010MWR3201.1
- Finley, C. A., B. D. Lee, M. Grzych, C. D. Karstens, and T. M. Samaras, 2010: Mobile mesonet observations of the rear-flank downdraft evolution associated with a violent tornado near Bowdle, SD on 22 May 2010. Electronic proceedings, 25th Conf. on Severe Local Storms, Denver, CO. Amer. Meteor. Soc., 8A.2. https://ams.confex.com/ams/pdfpapers/176132.pdf
- Karstens, C. D., T. M. Samaras, W. A. Gallus, C. A. Finley, B. D. Lee 2010: Analysis of near-surface wind flow in close proximity to tornadoes. Electronic proceedings, 25th Conf. on Severe Local Storms, Denver, CO. Amer. Meteor. Soc., P10.11. https://ams.confex.com/ams/pdfpapers/176188.pdf
- Lee, B. D., C. A. Finley, C. D. Karstens, and T. M. Samaras, 2010: Surface observations of the rear-flank downdraft evolution associated with the Aurora, NE tornado of 17 June 2009. Electronic proceedings, 25th Conf. on Severe Local Storms, Denver, CO. Amer. Meteor. Soc., P8.27. https://ams.confex.com/ams/pdfpapers/176133.pdf
- Finley, C. A., and B. D. Lee, 2008: Mobile mesonet observations of an Intense RFD and multiple gust fronts in the May 23 Quinter, Kansas tornadic supercell during TWISTEX 2008. Electronic proceedings, 24th Conf. on Severe Local Storms, Savannah, GA Amer. Meteor. Soc., P3.18. https://ams.confex.com/ams/pdfpapers/142133.pdf
- Karstens, C. D., T. M. Samaras, A. Laubach, B. D. Lee, C. A. Finley, W. A. Gallus, F. L. Hann, 2008. TWISTEX 2008: In situ and mobile mesonet observations of tornadoes. Electronic proceedings, 24th Conf. on Severe Local Storms, Savannah, GA Amer. Meteor. Soc., P3.11. https://ams.confex.com/ams/pdfpapers/141974.pdf
- Lee, B.D., C. A. Finley, and T. M. Samaras, 2008: Thermodynamic and kinematic analysis near and within the Tipton, KS tornado on May 29 during TWISTEX 2008. Electronic proceedings, 24th Conf. on Severe Local Storms, Savannah, GA Amer. Meteor. Soc., P3.13. https://ams.confex.com/ams/pdfpapers/142078.pdf
- Grzych, M. L., B. D. Lee, and C. A. Finley, 2007: Thermodynamic analysis of supercell rear-flank downdrafts from Project ANSWERS. Mon. Wea. Rev., 135, 240–246. http://ams.allenpress.com/perlserv/?request=get-pdf&doi=10.1175%2FMWR3288.1
- Finley, C. A., and B. D. Lee, 2004: High resolution mobile mesonet observations of RFD surges in the June 9 Basset, Nebraska supercell during project answers 2003. Preprints, 22nd Conf. on Severe Local Storms, Hyannis, MA, CD-ROM, 11.3. https://ams.confex.com/ams/pdfpapers/82005.pdf
- Lee, B. D., C. A. Finley, and P. Skinner, 2004: Thermodynamic and kinematic analysis of multiple RFD surges for the 24 June 2003 Manchester, South Dakota cyclic tornadic supercell during Project ANSWERS 2003. Preprints, 22nd Conf. on Severe Local Storms, Hyannis, MA, Amer. Meteor. Soc., CD-ROM, 11.2. https://ams.confex.com/ams/pdfpapers/82000.pdf
- Lee, J. J., T. M. Samaras, and C. R. Young, 2004: Pressure measurements at the ground in an F-4 tornado. 22nd Conf. on Severe Local Storms, Hyannis, MA, Amer, Meteor. Soc., CD_ROM, 15.3. https://ams.confex.com/ams/pdfpapers/81700.pdf
- Samaras, T. M., 2004: A historical perspective of in-situ observations within tornado cores. Preprints, 22nd Conf. on Severe Local Storms, Hyannis, MA, Amer, Meteor. Soc., CD_ROM, P11.4. https://ams.confex.com/ams/pdfpapers/81153.pdf
- Samaras, T.M., and J. J. Lee, 2004. Pressure measurements within a large tornado. Proc. 84th American Meteorological Society Annual Meeting - Eighth Symposium on Integrated Observing and Assimilation Systems for Atmosphere, Oceans, and Land Surface, Seattle, WA., P4.9. https://ams.confex.com/ams/pdfpapers/74267.pdf
- Wurman, J., and T. Samaras, 2004: Comparison of in-situ pressure and DOW Doppler winds in a tornado and RHI vertical slices through 4 tornadoes during 1996–2004. Extended Abstracts, 22nd Conf. on Severe Local Storms, Hyannis, MA, Amer. Meteor. Soc., 15.4, 1–14. https://ams.confex.com/ams/pdfpapers/82352.pdf

National Geographic (Book and articles about Samaras research)

- Tornado Hunter, by Stephen Bechtel with Tim Samaras. Published by National Geographic. pp. 272. Release May 19, 2009.
- National Geographic in the Field - Tim Samaras, Severe-Storms Researcher (2005)
- National Geographic Feature - New View of Tornadoes: From the Inside Looking Out (2005)
- National Geographic Events – Inside the Tornado (2005)
- National Geographic Today - Storm Chaser Deploys Probe, Makes History (2003)

American Society of Civil Engineers

- Samaras, T. M., and J. J. Lee, 2006: Measuring tornado dynamics with in-situ instrumentation. Proceedings of the 2006 Structures Congress: 2006 Structural Engineering and Public Safety. St. Louis, Missouri, pp. 1–10, (doi 10.1061/40889(201)12). http://cedb.asce.org/cgi/WWWdisplay.cgi?0609031

ABC News (Article about Samaras research)

- World News - Scientists Put an Eye in the Heart of the Storm (2005) https://abcnews.go.com/WNT/Science/story?id=831857
