= Tim Samaras =

American engineer and storm chaser (1957-2013)

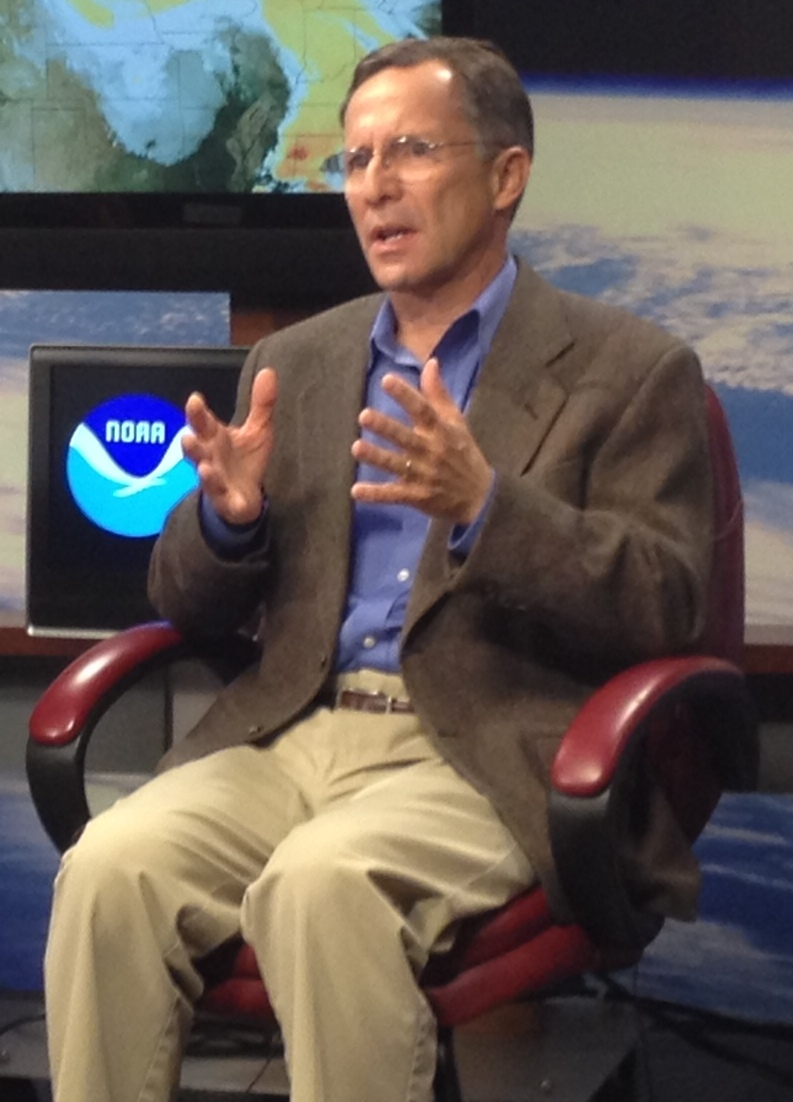
- Samaras in 2012
- Born: Timothy Michael Samaras; November 12, 1957; Lakewood, Colorado, U.S.
- Died: May 31, 2013 (aged 55); Canadian County, Oklahoma, U.S.
- Cause of death: Tornado incident
- Known for: Tornado field research
- Spouse: Kathy Samaras
- Children: 4
- Scientific career
- Fields: Engineering, meteorology
- Workplaces: Applied Research Associates

Timothy Michael Samaras (November 12, 1957 – May 31, 2013), was an American engineer and storm chaser best known for his field research on tornadoes and time on the Discovery Channel show Storm Chasers. He was killed in the 2013 El Reno tornado that occurred on May 31, 2013.

== Early life ==
Samaras was born November 12, 1957, in Lakewood, Colorado, to Paul T. and Margaret L. Samaras. His father was a photographer and model-airplane distributor who was an Army projectionist in WWII. Tim assisted in the photography and shop work. Samaras first became interested in tornadoes at age six, when he watched The Wizard of Oz on television with his mother. "When the tornado appeared," he recalled, "I was hooked!"

Samaras attended Lasley Elementary and O'Connell Junior High in Lakewood, before graduating from Alameda International Junior/Senior High School in 1976. In his twenties, he began to chase storms "not for the thrill, but the science."

== Career ==
Samaras was self-taught and never received a college degree. He became an amateur radio operator at age 12 and built transmitters using old television sets. As an adult he held an Amateur Extra Class license, the highest amateur radio class issued in the United States, and was proficient in Morse code. He communicated by amateur radio when chasing storms and was also a storm spotter, reporting sightings of hazardous weather. At 16, he was a radio technician, and was service shop foreman at 17. Immediately out of high school and without a résumé, he was hired as a walk-in at the University of Denver Research Institute. He obtained a Pentagon security clearance by 20, testing and building weapons systems.

Samaras was a prominent engineer at Applied Research Associates, initially focusing on blast testing and airline crash investigations. The National Transportation Safety Board (NTSB) recognized him for his investigations of the TWA Flight 800 crash. His research involved high-speed photography, such as on ballistics. He also worked at National Technical Systems and Hyperion Technology Group.

In addition to tornadoes, he was interested in all aspects of convective storms, with particular research focus on lightning, for which he utilized cameras shooting up to 1.4 million fps. An accomplished photographer and videographer, he also used photogrammetry, with some footage derived from cameras in probes shooting from within tornadoes. Samaras also shot for art and for pleasure. He was an avid amateur astronomer and also interested in electronics and inventions.

Samaras was the founder of a field research team called Tactical Weather Instrumented Sampling in Tornadoes EXperiment (TWISTEX), which sought to better understand tornadoes. His work was funded in large part by the National Geographic Society (NGS), which awarded him 18 grants for his field work.

Samaras designed his Turtle Probe and Tower Probe and deployed them in the path of tornadoes in order to gain scientific insight into the inner workings of a tornado. With one such in-situ probe, he captured the largest drop in atmospheric pressure ever recorded, 100 hPa (mb) in less than one minute, when an F4 tornado struck one of several probes placed near Manchester, South Dakota, on June 24, 2003. The accomplishment is listed in Guinness World Records as the "greatest pressure drop measured in a tornado". The probe was dropped on the path of the tornado to a mere 82 seconds before it hit. The measurement is also the lowest pressure (adjusted for elevation) ever recorded at Earth's surface, 850 hectopascals (25.10 inHg). Samaras later described the tornado as the most memorable of his career. Samaras' aerodynamic probes were a breakthrough design for their survivability inside tornadoes. A patent was pending for instrumentation measuring winds in 3D. Samaras held a patent, "Thermal imaging system for internal combustion engines", with Jon M. Lesko.

Samaras and his team logged over 35,000 miles (56,000 km) of driving during the two peak months of tornado season each year. When asked, Samaras said that the most dangerous part about following tornadoes is not the actual storms themselves, but rather the road hazards encountered along the way. In total, he tracked down more than 125 tornadoes during his career. His colleagues considered him to be one of the most careful chasers in the business.

Beginning in 1998, Samaras founded and co-produced (with Roger Hill) the National Storm Chasers Convention, an annual event held near Denver and attended by hundreds of chasers from around the world. Samaras' widow, Kathy, revealed in her first news interview after his death that she would continue ChaserCon, which consistently attracts luminary scientists and chasers as speakers. In 2005, he was named an "Emerging Explorer" by the National Geographic Society. From 2009 until the show's cancellation in 2012, Samaras was a featured personality on the Discovery Channel's Storm Chasers. During his career he also worked for Boeing, doing field testing on hail-resistant skins for aircraft, and for the federal government. According to Eileen O'Neill, president of the Discovery networks, Samaras' work was directly responsible for increased warning times ahead of tornadoes.

Samaras coauthored, along with Stefan Bechtel and Greg Forbes, Tornado Hunter: Getting Inside the Most Violent Storms on Earth (ISBN 978-1426203022), in 2009. Samaras authored or coauthored around a dozen scientific papers. He also contributed to Storm Track magazine. He appeared in major pieces in National Geographic in April 2004, June 2005, August 2012, and November 2013. He was also widely interviewed by news stations, newspapers, and magazines and appeared in documentaries.

== Death ==
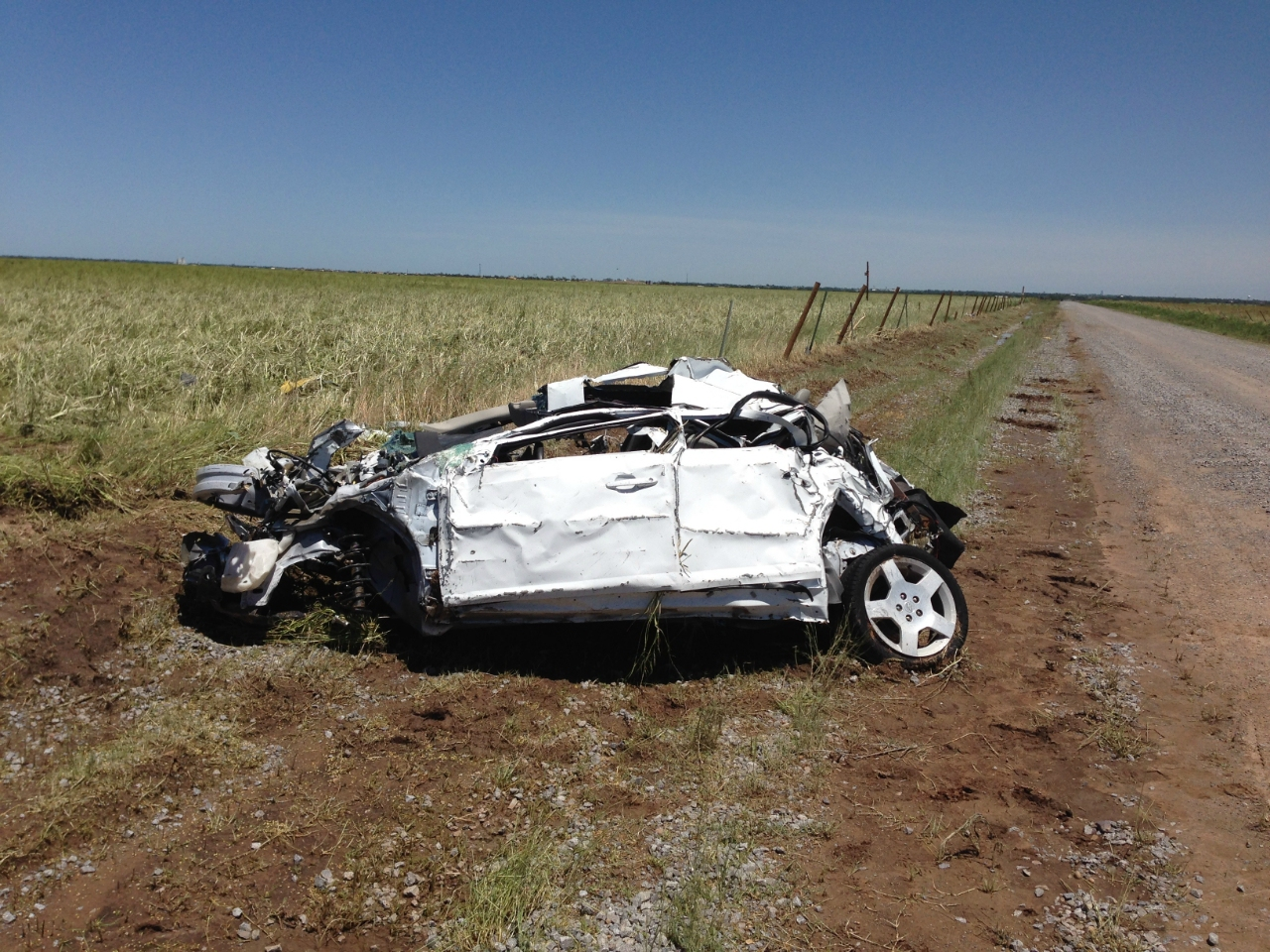
The wreck of Samaras's Chevy Cobalt near the intersection of Reuter Road and S. Radio Road approximately 4.8 mi (7.7 km) southeast of El Reno, Oklahoma.

In the spring of 2013, TWISTEX was conducting lightning research (Using Samara's "Big Kahuna" high-speed camera) when active tornadic periods ensued in mid to late May, so Samaras decided to deploy atmospheric pressure probes and to test infrasound tornado sensors that were still under development. At 6:23 p.m. on May 31, 2013, Samaras and his 24-year-old son Paul Samaras (a photographer), and 45-year-old TWISTEX team member Carl Young (a meteorologist), were killed by a violent wedge tornado with radar-estimated winds of 295 mph (475 km/h) near the Regional Airport of El Reno, Oklahoma. The TWISTEX vehicle was struck and thrown by a subvortex, which generate the highest winds; some of which were moving at 175 mph (282 km/h) within the parent tornado. Shortly before they were killed, Young stated “There’s no rain here.” . Tim Samaras then responded: "Actually, I think we're in a bad spot." According to Oklahoma Highway Patrol Trooper Betsy Randolph, the three could be heard screaming "We’re going to die, we’re going to die" over her patrol radio moments before the impact.

The tornado was sampled by University of Oklahoma RaXPol radar as 2.6 miles (4.2 km) wide, making it the widest tornado ever recorded. The true size of the multiple-vortex tornado confused onlookers by its mammoth proportions containing orbiting subvortices larger than average tornadoes and its expansive transparent to translucent outer circulation. The strong inflow and outer-circulation winds in conjunction with rocky roads and a relatively underpowered vehicle also hampered driving away from the tornado. The tornado simultaneously took an unexpected sharp turn, closing on their position as it rapidly accelerated within a few minutes from about 20 mph (32 km/h) to as much as 60 mph (97 km/h) in forward movement and swiftly expanded from about 1 mile (1.6 km) to 2.6 miles (4.2 km) wide in about 30 seconds, and was mostly obscured in heavy precipitation, all of which combined so that several other chasers were also hit or had near misses. It was the first known instance of a storm chaser or a meteorologist killed by a tornado.

Even before it was known that Samaras, his son, and Young had been killed, the event led many to question storm-chasing tactics, particularly in close proximity to tornadoes. In addition to the three TWISTEX members, the tornado killed five other people, including local resident Richard Charles Henderson, who had decided to follow the storm.

Atmospheric scientists and storm chasers embarked on a major project to gather information and analyze what happened regarding chaser actions and meteorological occurrences. A makeshift memorial was established at the site soon after the incident and a crowdfunded permanent memorial, spearheaded by Doug Gerten, the deputy who first found the vehicle wreckage, was later established, although it was vandalized in late March 2016, with the monument struck by bullets and the American flag cut away from the flagpole.

Meteorologists at the Storm Prediction Center (SPC) issued a statement saying they were very saddened by Tim's death. "Samaras was a respected tornado researcher and friend ... who brought to the field a unique portfolio of expertise in engineering, science, writing and videography," read the statement. Severe weather expert Greg Forbes called Samaras "a groundbreaker in terms of the kind of research he was doing on severe thunderstorms and tornadoes". Meteorologist Jim Cantore remarked, "This is a very sad day for the meteorological community and the families of our friends lost. Tim Samaras was a pioneer and great man." National Geographic remarked, "Tim was a courageous and brilliant scientist who fearlessly pursued tornadoes and lightning in the field in an effort to better understand these phenomena." On Facebook, Samaras' brother said he died "doing what [he] LOVED. Chasing Tornadoes". On June 2, Discovery dedicated Mile Wide Tornado: Oklahoma, a special about the May 20 Moore, Oklahoma, tornado, to the memory of Samaras and his TWISTEX colleagues.

He was survived by his wife Kathy, two daughters, a son from a previous relationship, brothers Jim and Jack, and two grandchildren. His memorial service was held on June 6, 2013, at Mission Hills Church in Littleton, Colorado.

== Personal life ==
Samaras and his wife Kathy had three children — Paul (November 12, 1988 – May 31, 2013), Amy Gregg, and Jennifer Samaras. The family lived on 35 acres near Bennett, Colorado, at the time of his death. The open space enabled Tim to erect amateur radio and other towers and provided ample room for workshops. He learned of the property through real estate investment work that he did on the side and to which his brother Jim introduced him. Samaras had another son, Matt Winter, whom he had learned about only seven years before Samaras' death and who was welcomed into the family. Winter was also fascinated by weather and was informed by his mother that Tim was his father after he heard Samaras speak at the 2006 Severe Storms and Doppler Radar Conference in Des Moines, Iowa.

In 2011, Samaras took time off chasing to help build homes in Alabama for victims of tornadoes earlier that year. According to O'Neill, he worked "from dawn to dusk" with "the same dedication and focus he brought to his meteorological work".
