= RaXPol =

Weather radar

RaXPol (Rapid X-band Polarimetric Radar)
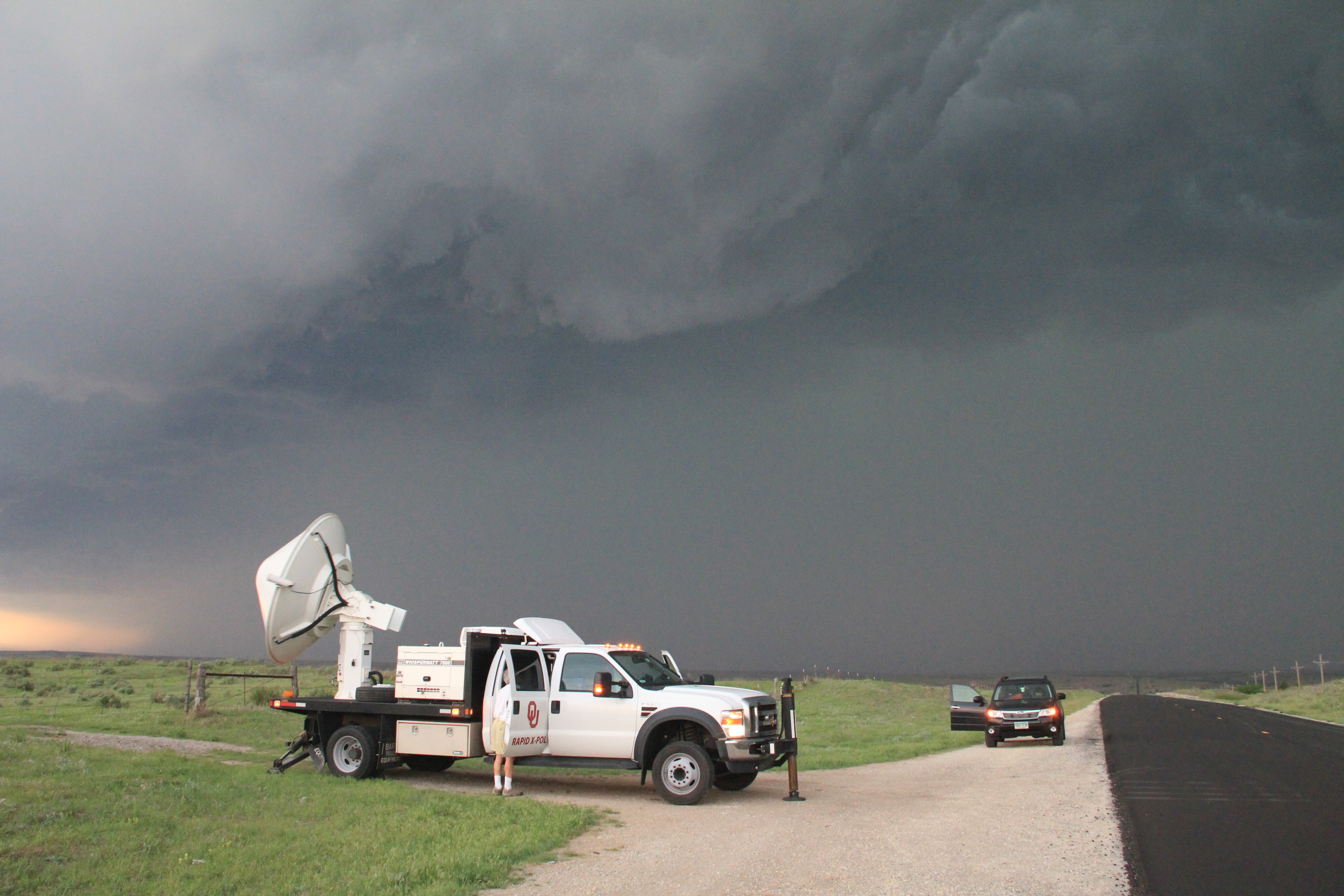
- RaXPol scanning a severe thunderstorm in Oklahoma
- Country of origin: USA
- Introduced: 2011
- No. built: 1
- Type: Weather radar
- Frequency: 9.73 GHz (X Band)
- PRF: Adjustable 1,000 to 8,000 Hz
- Beamwidth: 1.0°
- Pulsewidth: Adjustable 0.1 to 40 μs
- RPM: up to 30 rpm
- Diameter: 2.4 m (7.9 ft)
- Azimuth: 360°
- Power: 20 kW

The Rapid X-band Polarimetric Radar, commonly abbreviated as RaXPol, is a mobile research radar designed and developed by ProSensing Inc. using NSF MRI funds from the University of Oklahoma, and maintained and operated by the University of Oklahoma, led by Howard Bluestein. RaXPol often collaborates with adjacent mobile radar projects, such as Doppler on Wheels and SMART-R. Unlike its counterparts, RaXPol typically places emphasis on temporal resolution, and as such is capable of surveilling the entire local atmosphere in three dimensions in as little as 20 seconds, or a single level in less than 3 seconds. RaXPol scanned the 2013 El Reno tornado, capturing wind speeds exceeding 300 mph, the second highest ever recorded.

== History and deployment ==
Ever since meteorological observations on radar were first made widespread, the need for high-temporal resolution and comprehensive volumetric imagery of all three dimensions of weather phenomena has been a very high priority, due in large part to the fact that hazardous weather often happens in the span of seconds, and often in the lowest 1 kilometer of the atmosphere. In pursuit of better resolution in time, the NEXRAD network deploys several time-saving measures to accelerate data rates in these three dimensions, such as M.R.L.E. and MESO-SAILS, which can be bringing scan time down from 5–7 minutes to 2–3 minutes. In March 2011 ProSensing Inc. delivered RaXPol to the University of Oklahoma, and the University of Oklahoma's Advanced Radar Research Center began maintaining and operating the radar, with a focus on rapid deployment and analysis of the atmosphere. By April 2011, RaXPol was being deployed in field campaigns across Tornado Alley, and has taken part in numerous NSF funded research projects and organizations, such as PECAN, TORUS, and IMPACTS.

== Findings ==
RaXPol has documented numerous hazardous weather events throughout its deployment history, among them being several dozen particularly intense tornadoes. On May 24, 2011, RaXPol observed an extremely violent EF-5 tornado near El Reno, Oklahoma at very high temporal resolution, measuring doppler velocities in excess of 250 mph. Two years later, RaXPol observed the widest tornado in recorded history (2.6 miles wide), also near the town of El Reno. RaXPol recorded winds up to 150 metres per second (340 mph; 540 km/h) inside the tornado, marking the fastest winds ever observed by radar in history. Based on this data, the tornado was initially rated EF-5, but was later downgraded to an EF-3 due to the lack of supporting damage on the ground. Data gathered from RaXPol also indicates that the formation of tornadoes may not be a top-down process as was once thought.
