= Terminal Doppler Weather Radar =

Doppler weather radar system

Airports with a TDWR in the US. Another in San Juan, Puerto Rico, is not shown on this map.

Terminal Doppler Weather Radar (TDWR) is a Doppler weather radar system with a three-dimensional "pencil beam" used primarily for the detection of hazardous wind shear conditions, precipitation, and winds aloft on and near major airports situated in climates with great exposure to thunderstorms in the United States. As of 2011, all were in-service with 45 operational radars, some covering multiple airports in major metropolitan locations, across the United States & Puerto Rico. Several similar weather radars have also been sold to other countries such as China (Hong Kong). Funded by the United States Federal Aviation Administration (FAA), TDWR technology was developed in the early 1990s at Lincoln Laboratory, part of the Massachusetts Institute of Technology, to assist air traffic controllers by providing real-time wind shear detection and high-resolution precipitation data.

The primary advantage of TDWRs over previous weather radars is that it has a finer range resolution—meaning it can see smaller areas of the atmosphere. The reason for the resolution is that the TDWR has a narrower beam than traditional radar systems, and that it uses a set of algorithms to reduce ground clutter.

== Characteristics ==
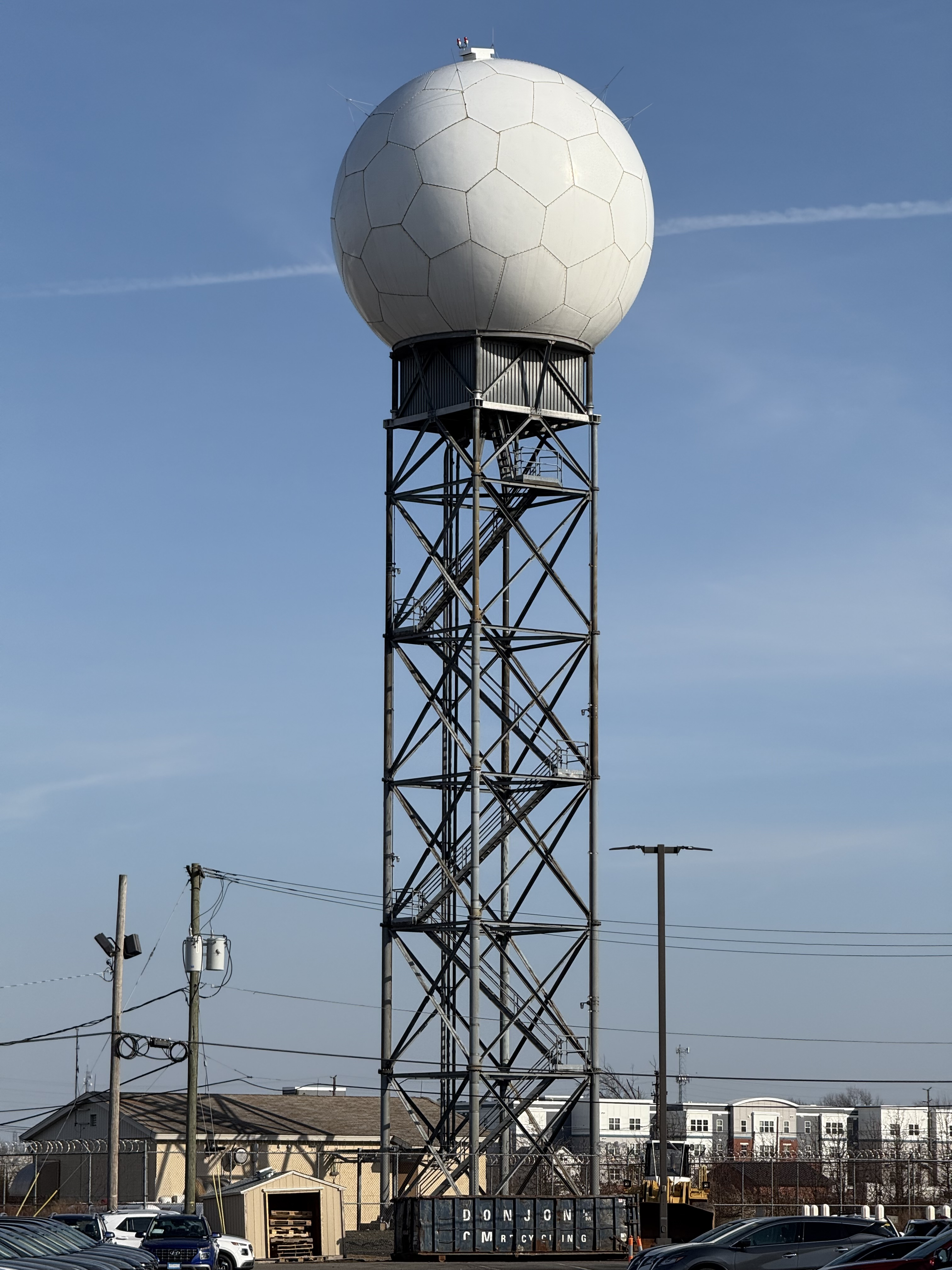
The TDWR serving Newark Liberty International Airport in New Jersey

TDWR uses a carrier wave in the frequency band of 5600–5650 MHz (5 cm wavelength), with a narrow beam and angular resolution of 0.5 degrees, and has a peak power of 250 kW. In reflectivity, the resolution in distance is 150 metres (500 ft) within 135 kilometres (84 mi) of the radar and 300 metres (1,000 ft) from 135 kilometres (84 mi) to 460 kilometres (290 mi) to the radar. The reason for this difference is that since the width resolution is angular, at larger range the width of the beam becomes quite large and to obtain a better averaging of data in a resolution volume, one has to increase the number of range pulse bins. This cut off is arbitrarily set for the software at 135 kilometres (84 mi).

In radial velocities, data are available up to 90 kilometres (56 mi) from the radar with the full angular resolution of 0.5 degrees and range resolution of 150 metres (490 ft). Because of the Pulse Repetition Frequency (PRF) used, there is aliasing and the maximum non-ambiguous velocity is 20 to 30 knots (23 to 35 mph; 37 to 56 km/h).

TDWR can perform near-surface scans at a 0.1-0.3 degree angle of inclination from the Earth's surface every minute. It can also perform composite scans in which the radar observes at several different angles of inclination in order to obtain a fuller picture of the atmospheric conditions; each such composite scan requires 6 minutes.

== Comparison with NEXRAD ==
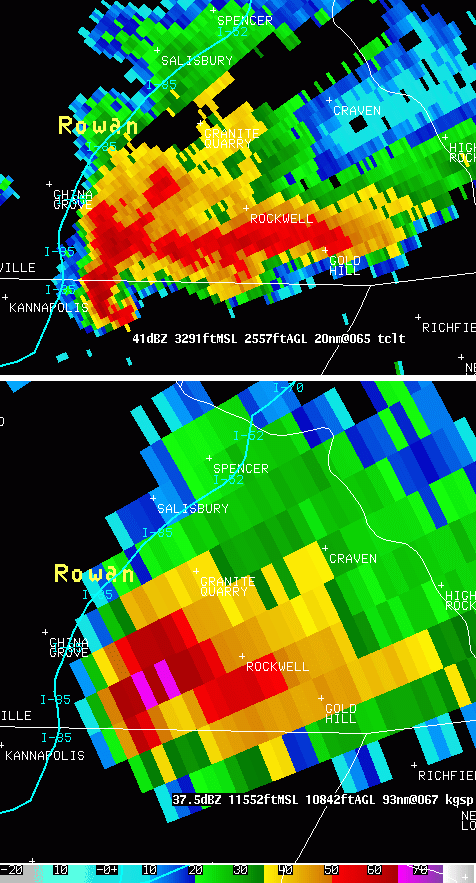
A TDWR return (top) and NEXRAD return (bottom) showing the improved resolution in reflectivity, but also showing the attenuation in the TDWR due to absorption from heavy precipitation as a black gap

=== Advantages ===
A NEXRAD weather radar currently used by the National Weather Service (NWS) is a 10 cm wavelength (2700-3000 MHz) radar capable of a complete scan every 4.5 to 10 minutes, depending on the number of angles scanned, and depending on whether or not MESO-SAILS is active, which adds a supplemental low-level scan while completing a volume scan. Its resolution is 0.5 degrees in width and 250 metres (820 ft) in horizontal. The non-ambiguous radial velocity is 62 knots (71 mph; 115 km/h) up to 230 kilometres (140 mi) from the radar.

The range resolution of the TDWR is nearly twice that of that classic NEXRAD scheme. This will give much better details on small features in precipitation patterns, particularly in thunderstorms, in reflectivity and radial velocity. However, this finer resolution is only available up to 135 kilometres (84 mi) from the radar; beyond that, the resolution is close to that of the NEXRAD. However, since August 2008, oversampling on NEXRAD has increased its resolution in lower elevations in reflectivity data to 0.25 km (0.16 mi) by 0.5 degree, and increased the range of Doppler velocity data to 300 km (190 mi). This lessens the advantages of TDWR for those elevations.

=== Shortcomings ===
The TDWRs and NEXRADs complement each other with overlapping coverage, each designed to optimally view different airspace regimes. TDWR's rapid update rate over short range (55 nmi range) captures microscale weather events quickly in terminal airspace. NEXRAD is a long range radar (200 nmi range) designed to serve multiple en route functions at high altitude, above terminal airspace, and far between terminals. NEXRAD's slower update rate covering a wider volume, captures mesoscale weather events. The shorter 5 centimetres (2.0 in) wavelength, which is closer to the size of a raindrop than the 10 centimetres (3.9 in) wavelength, is partially absorbed by precipitation. This is a serious drawback to using TDWR, as the signal can be strongly attenuated in heavy precipitation. This attenuation means that the radar cannot "see" very far through heavy rain and could miss severe weather such as strong thunderstorms which may contain the signature of a tornado, when there is heavy rain falling between the radar and that storm. When heavy rain is falling on the radome, the range of the TDWR is further limited. Finally, hail in a thunderstorm scanned by a TDWR can entirely block the signal as its size is larger than the wavelength.

A second problem is the smaller non-ambiguous radial velocity or Nyquist velocity. In the case of the TDWR, this means the velocity of precipitations moving at a speed beyond 30 knots (35 mph; 56 km/h) away or toward the radar will be analyzed incorrectly because of aliasing. Algorithms to correct for this do not always yield the proper results. NEXRAD has a threshold that is twice as high (62 knots (71 mph; 115 km/h)) and thus less processing and interpretation are needed. Because of this, the resolution of radar reflectivity for small scale features such as mesocyclones might be better in TDWR, but the velocity resolution may be worse, or at the very least incorrectly analyzed.

Thus, it is best to use the TDWR in conjunction with a traditional NEXRAD nearby to ensure that nothing is missed. In contrast to NEXRAD, which has national coverage of the contiguous United States (although with some holes due to terrain), TDWR has sporadic coverage meant for major airports. While certain areas of the country (the Northeast megalopolis, the states of Ohio and Florida, and the southwestern quarter of Tornado Alley in Oklahoma and Texas) have a high density of TDWR units, others (the entire West Coast, the northern Great Plains and Rocky Mountains, portions of the Deep South, and a stretch running from northern Pennsylvania through upstate New York and into northern New England) have no TDWR coverage at all.

== Data processing improvements ==
The National Severe Storms Laboratory (NSSL) has a program of development and improvement of radar products extracted from data obtained from TDWR and NEXRAD radars. The Severe Weather Warning Applications and Technology Transfer (SWAT) group is sponsored by the National Weather Service and the FAA. It is working in 2009 on better filtering of non-weather echoes, better dealiasing algorithms of velocities, techniques to extract the horizontal component of the wind field from one or multiple radars. NSSL has been providing TDWR data to NWS office since the late 1990s. The NWS's Radar Operations Center (ROC), although focused on the NEXRAD network, also works with TDWRs.

== See also ==
- Airborne wind shear detection and alert system
- Low-level windshear alert system
