= 2011 El Reno–Piedmont tornado =

2011 EF5 tornado in Oklahoma

Coordinates: 35.444°N 98.287°W

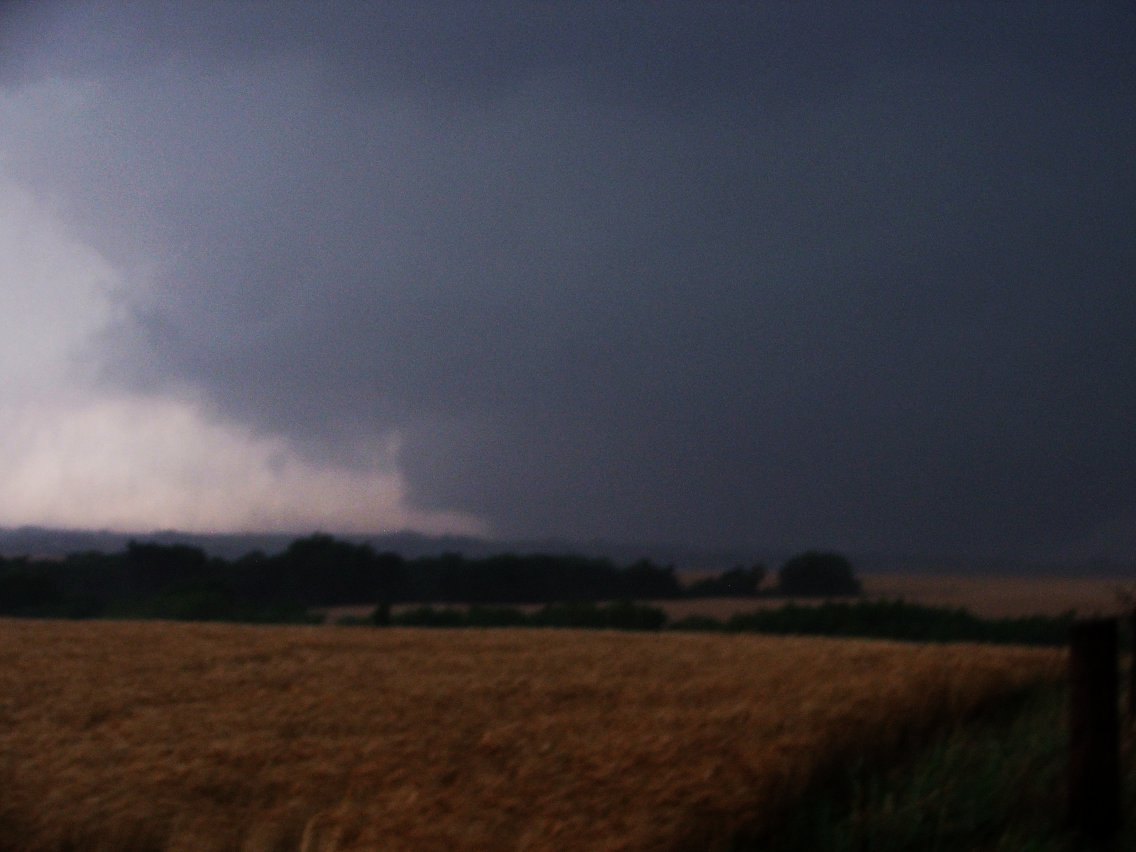
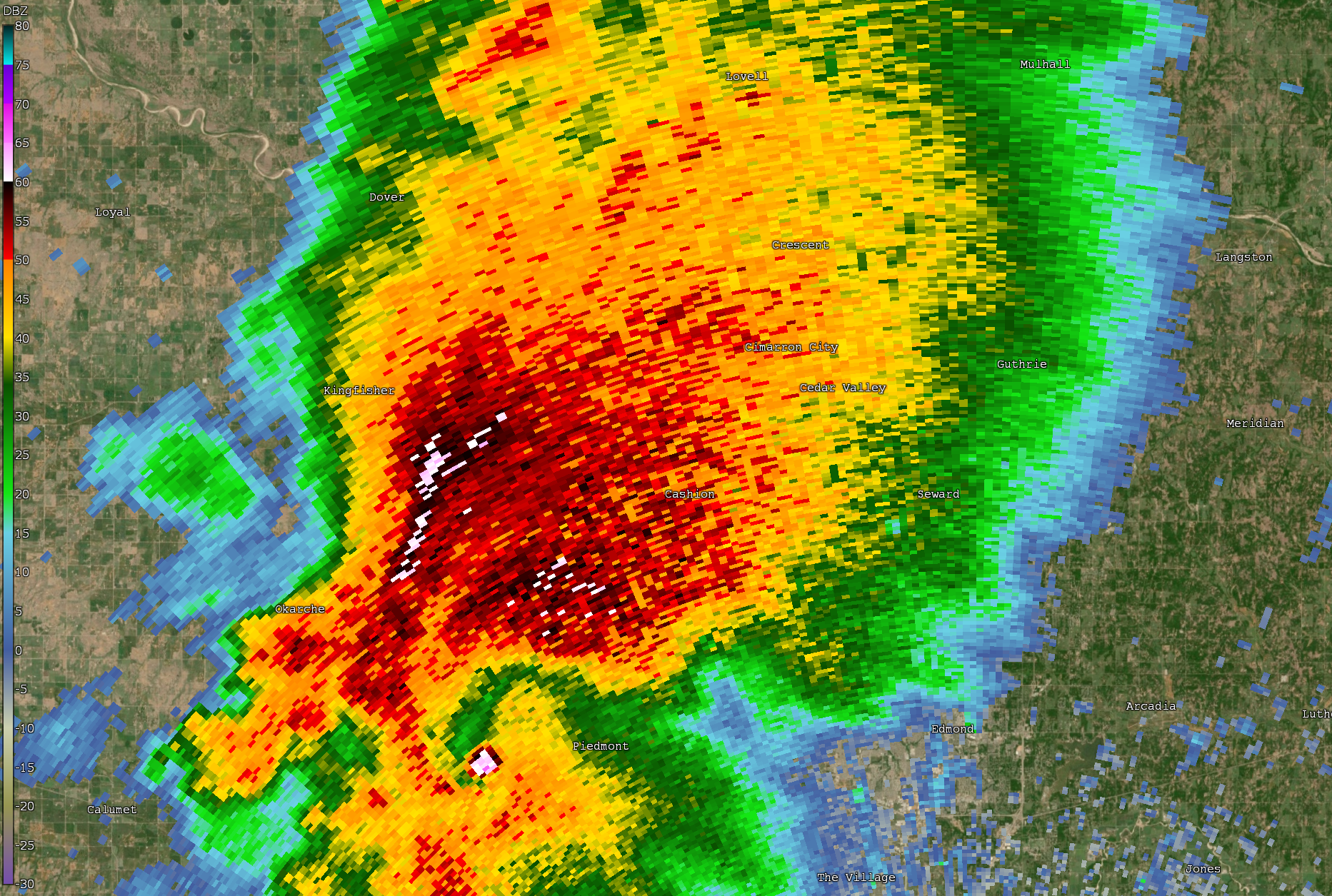
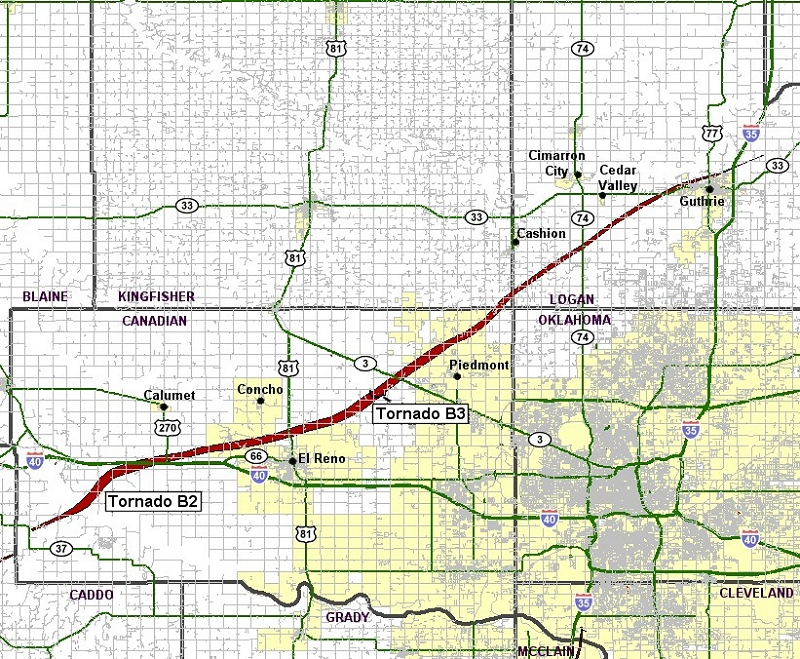
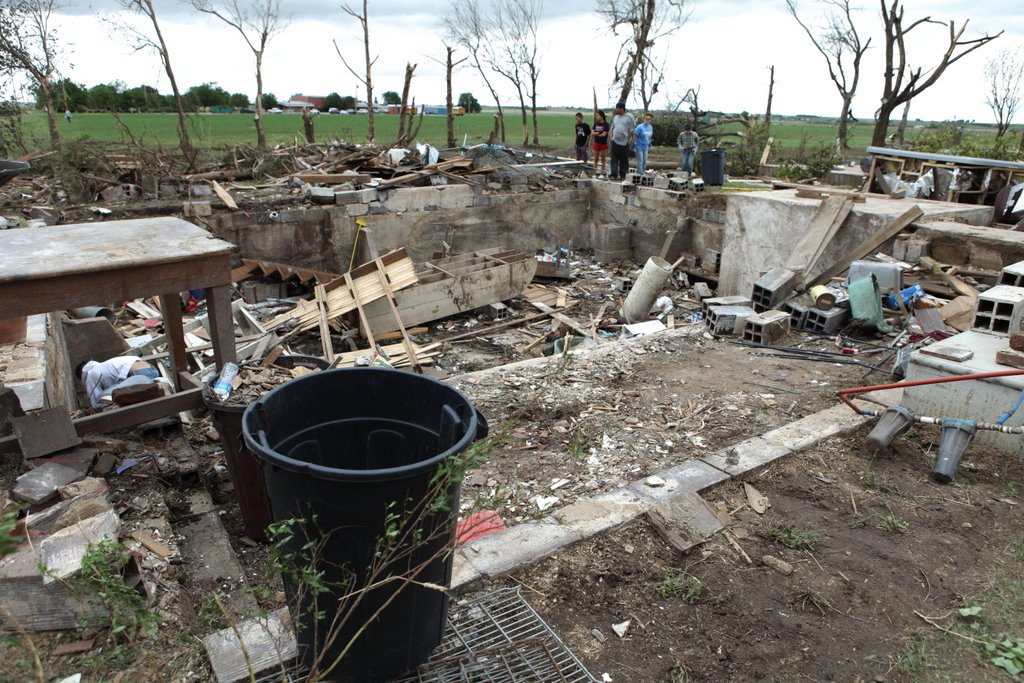
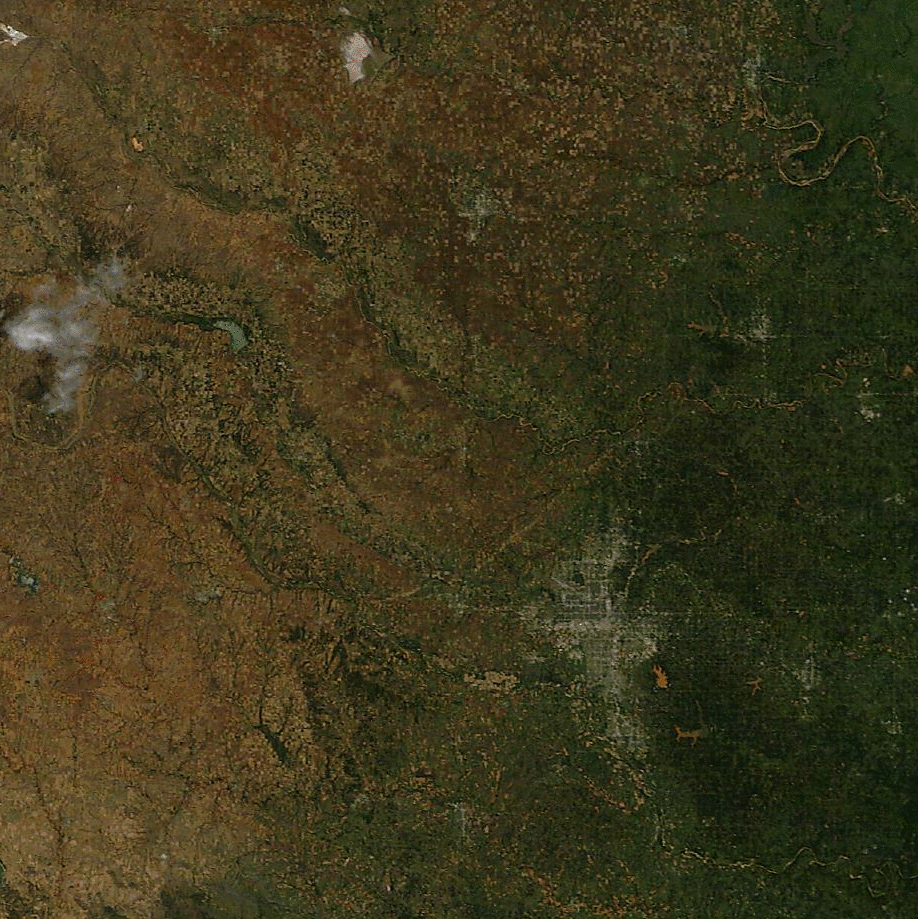
- Counterclockwise from top: The EF5 tornado seen near peak intensity north of El Reno; track of the tornado’s path, marked as B2, with a satellite tornado marked as B3; MODIS satellite imagery on May 26 of a scar left behind by the tornado; EF4 damage to a farmhouse north of El Reno; NEXRAD doppler radar of the tornado, marked by a debris ball (white pixels), just west of Piedmont

Meteorological history
- Formed: May 24, 2011, 3:51 p.m. CDT (UTC–05:00)
- Dissipated: May 24, 2011, 5:35 p.m. CDT (UTC–05:00)
- Duration: 1 hour, 44 minutes

EF5 tornado
- on the Enhanced Fujita scale
- Max width: 1,760 yards (1.0 mi; 1.6 km)
- Path length: 63.1 miles (101.5 km)
- Highest winds: Official intensity: >210 mph (340 km/h); Radar-estimated: 295 mph (475 km/h) (Fourth-highest worldwide; as measured by RaXPol Doppler weather radar analysis)

Overall effects
- Fatalities: 9
- Injuries: 181
- Damage: Unknown
- Areas affected: Canadian, Kingfisher and Logan Counties; specifically near Calumet, El Reno, Piedmont and Guthrie, Oklahoma, United States
- Part of the tornado outbreak sequence of May 21–26, 2011 and tornadoes of 2011

During the late-afternoon hours of May 24, 2011, a large, long-tracked and exceptionally violent EF5 tornado, commonly known as the El Reno–Piedmont tornado, impacted areas near or within the communities of El Reno, Piedmont, and Guthrie, killing nine people and injuring 181 others. After producing incredible damage in several locations along a path of more than 60 miles (97 km), the tornado was given a rating of EF5 on the Enhanced Fujita scale, with peak wind speeds in excess of 210 mph (340 km/h), although a mobile Doppler radar found that the tornado possessed wind speeds of up to 295 mph (475 km/h). The tornado was the first F5/EF5 tornado to occur in Oklahoma since May 3, 1999, when an F5 tornado devastated areas in and around the Oklahoma City metropolitan area.

The tornado touched down in southwestern Canadian County and quickly became violent, debarking numerous trees as it passed through areas several miles southwest of Calumet. As it approached and crossed I-40 west of El Reno, it reached its maximum intensity. A nearby 20,000-pound (9,100 kg) oil tanker truck that was parked at an oil production site near the interstate was thrown approximately one mile (1.6 km) into a wooded gully. A farmhouse was destroyed along I-40. At the nearby Cactus-117 oil rig site, a 1,900,000-pound (860,000 kg) oil derrick was blown over and rolled three times. The tornado remained very violent as it passed north of El Reno and continued northeast, producing EF3 to EF4 damage in rural areas. The tornado then re-intensified and passed northwest of Piedmont at high-end EF4 intensity, leveling multiple homes and causing additional fatalities. Moving into Kingfisher County and Logan County south of Cashion, the tornado fluctuated several times between EF2 and EF3 intensity, causing varying degrees of damage. Afterwards, the tornado then rapidly weakened, causing EF0 to EF1 damage along the north side of Guthrie before dissipating.

2011 was a prolific year for tornadoes and tornado-associated fatalities, with multiple destructive outbreaks. The El Reno–Piedmont tornado occurred during an outbreak across Oklahoma and the Great Plains that produced multiple strong to violent tornadoes near the Oklahoma City metropolitan area on May 24, and was itself part of a tornado outbreak sequence spanning from May 21–26. The Oklahoma storms came just two days after a devastating EF5 tornado struck Joplin, Missouri, which killed 158 people and became the costliest tornado in U.S. history.

Additionally, the city of El Reno had and has infamously been the site of other intense tornadoes. On May 31, 2013, a tornado just south of the town became the largest ever recorded, with a width of 2.6 miles (4.2 km) and radar-indicated wind speeds in excess of 296 mph (476 km/h). The massive multiple-vortex tornado killed eight people, including three storm chasers, and received a damage rating of EF3. In the late evening hours of May 25, 2019, a brief low-end EF3 tornado that spawned from an intense squall line struck just southeast of El Reno, killing two people and injuring dozens of others.

== Meteorological synopsis ==
=== Setup ===
Early on May 24, a strong upper-level trough (an elongated region of low atmospheric pressure aloft) advanced towards the Great Plains out of the southwestern United States and took on a negative tilt, becoming oriented northwest to southeast.

At the same time, southerly flow brought moisture north over Texas and the southern Great Plains, allowing dew points in Central Oklahoma to reach 18–21 °C (64–70 °F). This moisture, with temperatures in the mid 80 °F (27 °C) range, allowed for ample convective available potential energy (or CAPE, a measure of atmospheric instability); values reached 2500–4000 J/kg. Mid-level lapse rates were nearly dry adiabatic.

In the late morning, a shortwave embedded within the main longwave trough advanced more rapidly, pushing the dryline into western Oklahoma, where it met the already-present moisture. The shortwave's advance also brought strong wind shear and "incredibly high" storm-relative helicity values of more than 500 m^{2}s^{−2}. The convergence of all these factors promised the development of intense convective thunderstorms.

=== Forecast ===
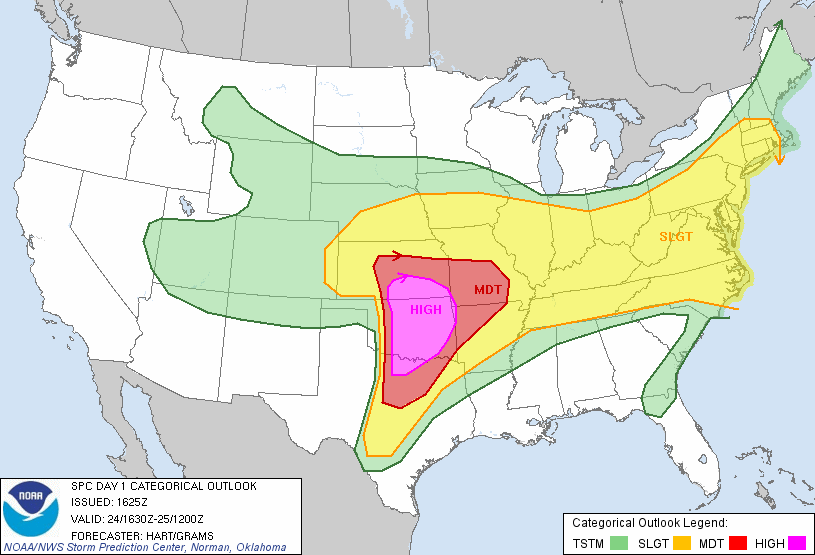
The National Weather Service Storm Prediction Center's Day 1 Convective Outlook for May 24, showing the Categorical Graphic

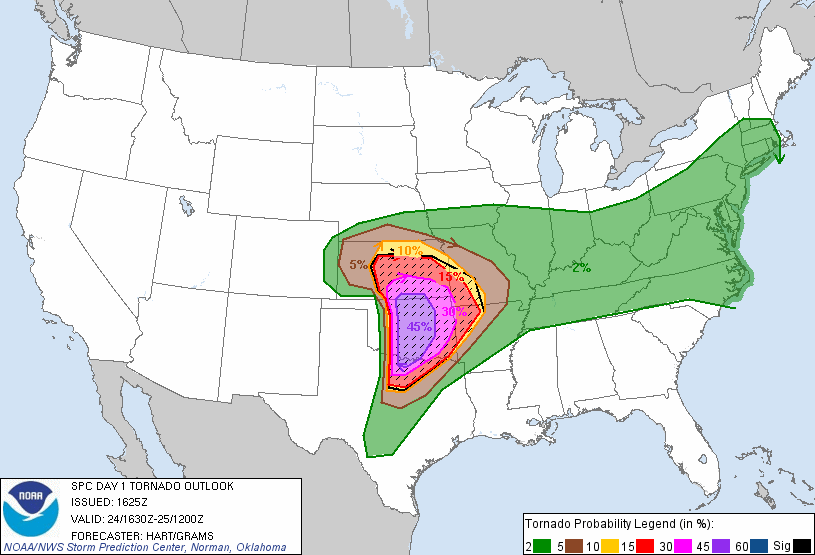
The probability of a tornado within 25 miles of a point (cross-hatched area: 10% or greater probability of EF2+ tornadoes)

This risk was anticipated by the National Weather Service's Storm Prediction Center (SPC), and its local forecast office in Norman, Oklahoma. The Storm Prediction Center's outlooks for severe weather culminated in a high risk area being delineated over the Great Plains for May 24. Issued at 11:25 a.m. CDT, the Storm Prediction Center's convective outlook for the day highlighted the tornado risk, which included central Oklahoma inside a large region of a 45% chance of a tornado touchdown within 25 miles (40 km) of any given point, and a 10% or greater chance of a significant (EF2+) tornado within that same 25-mile (40 km) radius.

...AN INTENSE OUTBREAK OF TORNADOES AND WIDESPREAD SEVERE THUNDERSTORMS IS EXPECTED LATER TODAY OVER PORTIONS OF KS/OK/TX...

...WITH ALL CONDITIONS FAVORING THE POTENTIAL FOR LONG-TRACKED STRONG/VIOLENT TORNADOES AND VERY LARGE HAIL OVER PORTIONS OF NORTH TX...CENTRAL OK...AND CENTRAL KS.

— NWS Storm Prediction Center (SPC), May 24, 2011 1630 UTC Day 1 Convective Outlook

At 12:50 p.m., the Storm Prediction Center issued a particularly dangerous situation (PDS) tornado watch, to remain in effect until 10:00 p.m., for most of central Oklahoma extending from the state border with Kansas down through the Oklahoma City metropolitan area and into northern Texas. The text of the tornado watch again warned of the possible development of "destructive tornadoes... ...some of which could be long-tracked and strong to violent."

=== Initiation ===
Thunderstorms began to develop before 2:00 p.m. in a north–south oriented line just east of the dryline where the capping inversion was weakest, including near Altus and Lawton in southwest Oklahoma. The tightly spaced storm cells rapidly developed classic supercell characteristics as they moved northeast. The storm that produced the El Reno–Piedmont tornado formed approximately 93 miles (150 km) west-southwest of Oklahoma City.

== Tornado summary ==
=== Background ===
The supercell that eventually generated the El Reno–Piedmont tornado first produced a tornado in Caddo County, Oklahoma, which tracked from west of the town of Lookeba to just northeast of it. The Lookeba tornado developed at 3:31 p.m. and persisted for approximately 16 minutes, traveling nine miles (14 km) and destroying multiple structures. The 800-yard-wide (730 m) tornado earned a damage rating of EF3. As the Lookeba tornado moved northeast towards the Caddo/Canadian county border, between 3:40 and 3:42 p.m. the supercell's mesocyclone broadened and weakened slightly; this was followed by the development of a second mesocyclone from the original to the east-southeast between 3:42 and 3:44 p.m. This marked the start of the decay of the Lookeba tornado, which fully dissipated by 3:47 p.m. Over the next several minutes the original western mesocyclone dwindled as the newer mesocyclone coalesced, and the radar detection of a bounded weak echo region within the storm indicated that its updraft intensified during this period.

=== Formation, peak intensity and Interstate 40 ===
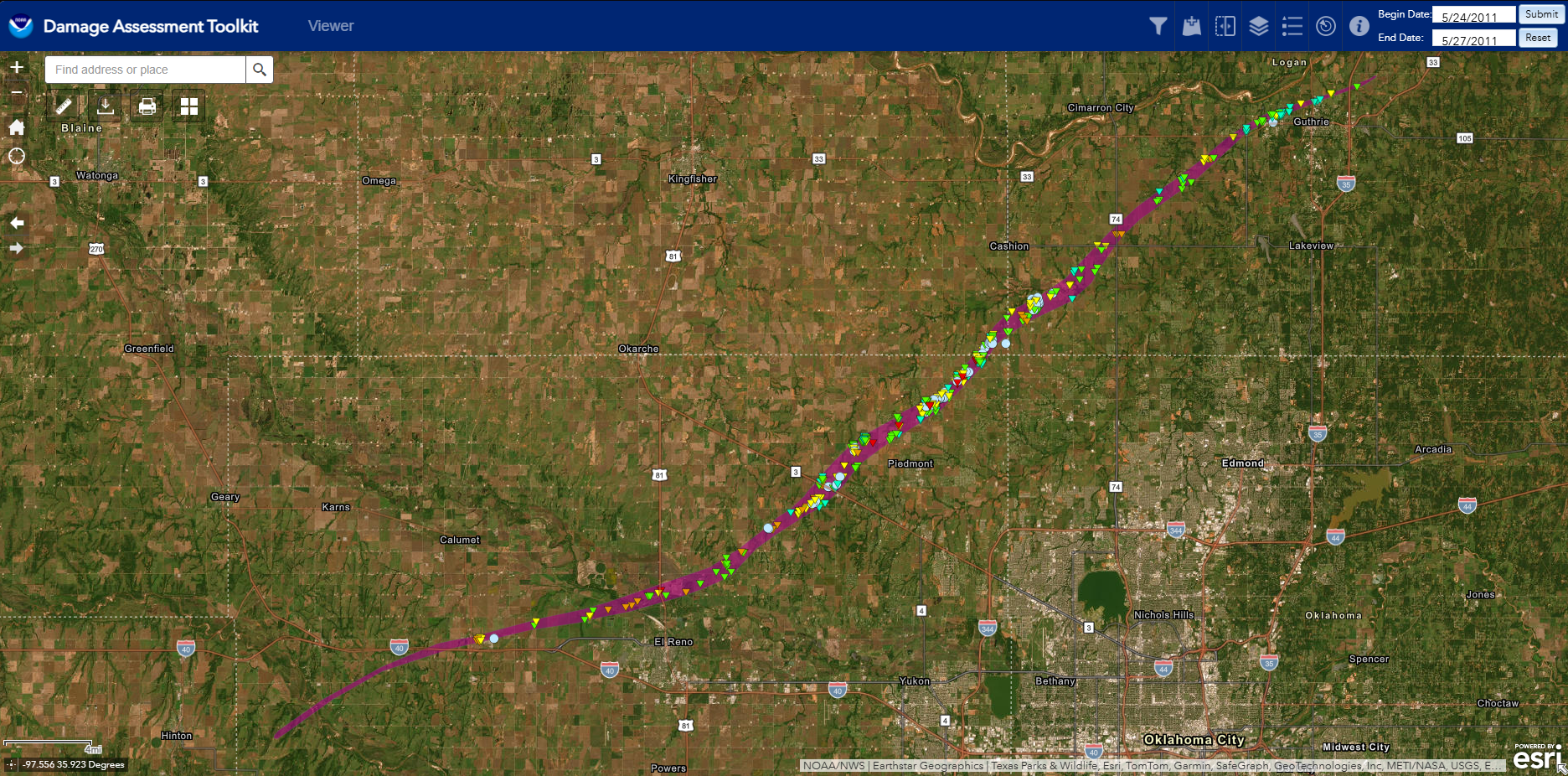
Track of the EF5 tornado throughout Canadian, Kingfisher and Logan Counties. Parameters Other (Miscellaneous) EF0 / 65–85 mph EF1 / 86–110 mph EF2 / 111–135 mph EF3 / 136–165 mph EF4 / 166–200 mph EF5 / 201+ mph (No damage points)

The El Reno–Piedmont tornado formed in western Canadian County at 3:51 p.m., as determined by mobile radar data. Over the next four minutes, the tornado's condensation funnel extending from a low-hanging wall cloud broadened, causing the tornado to take on a large 'wedge' appearance. It intensified quickly as it moved northeast, debarking and destroying many trees at EF5 intensity. During this period, the storm was being monitored by a truck-mounted Rapid-Scan X-band Polarimetric (RaXPol) mobile Doppler weather radar, operated by the University of Oklahoma's Advanced Radar Research Center (ARRC) led by Howard Bluestein. That radar, stationed near the intersection of Smith Road and Walbaum Road less than two miles (3.2 km) south of I-40, captured the "first polarimetric, rapid-scan, mobile Doppler weather radar dataset of an EF-5 tornado."

==== Radar analysis ====
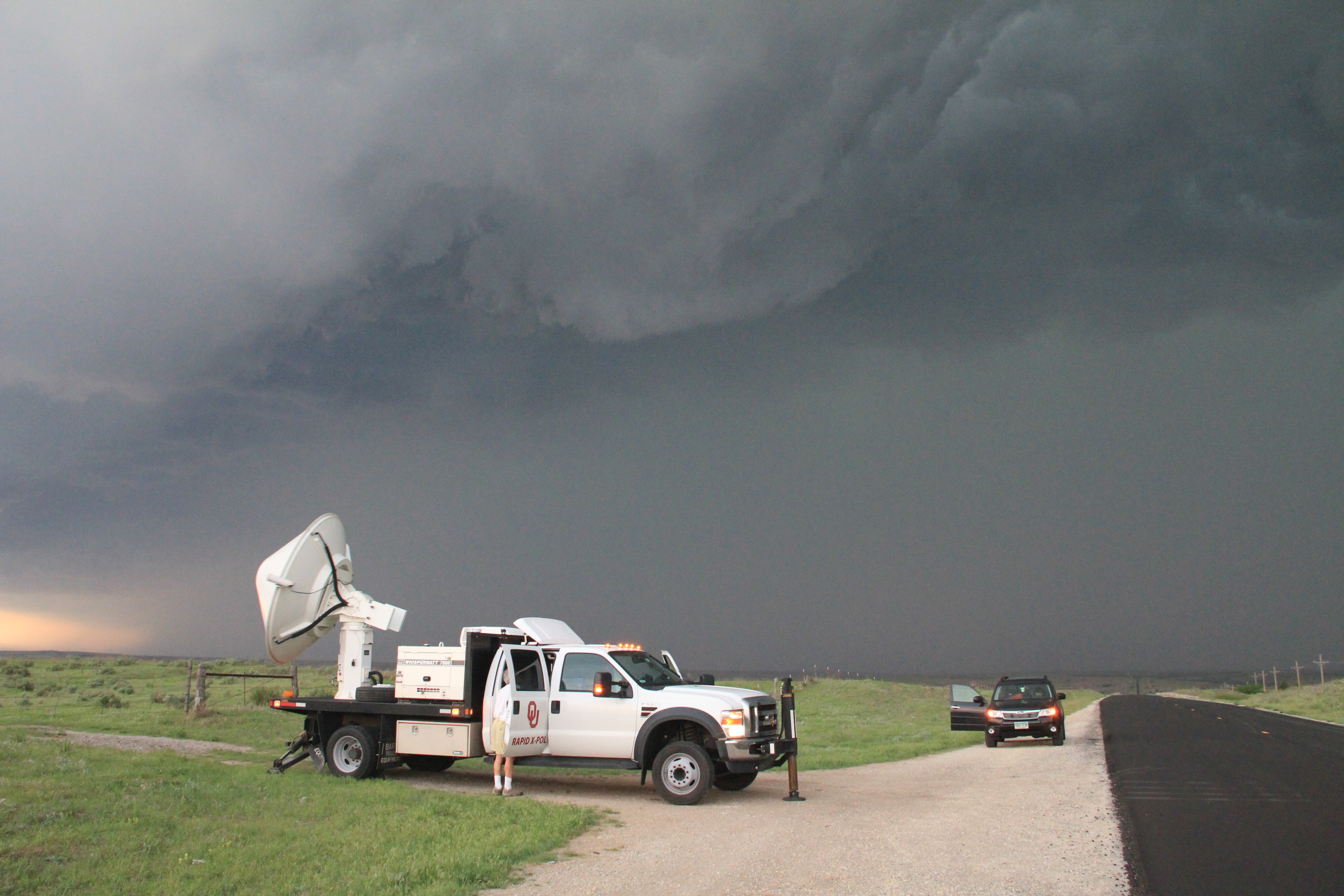
The RaXPol mobile Doppler radar, shown here scanning a severe thunderstorm in Oklahoma in 2013

As the tornado moved towards I-40 to the southeast of the RaXPol radar and was peaking in intensity, it detected some of the fastest wind speeds ever measured on the planet. Interpretations slightly differ: the maximum instantaneous radial velocity sampled by the radar was originally reported as having been 124.8 m/s (279 mph), measured 200–230 feet (60–70 m) above the ground at 4:00:26 p.m.; however, the maximum velocity was later reported as having been 132.1 m/s (295 mph) measured ~72 feet (22 m) "above radar level" at 4:00:39 p.m. in a 2014 paper by Bluestein et al. on the use of radar data for tornado ratings. Maximum radial velocities were also reported to have remained "greater than 120.0 m/s (268 mph) for several minutes." Additionally, multiple consecutive radar scans were averaged to yield an estimated 2-second average radial velocity of 118.4 m/s (265 mph) and an estimated 4-second average velocity of 110.8 m/s (248 mph). This was reported as "likely to be an underestimate of the true 2- and 4-s average wind speeds."

The instantaneous velocity readings taken are not directly equivalent to the three-second gust at 33 feet (10 m) that the Enhanced Fujita scale attempts to estimate, but they mark the second-highest wind speed ever recorded in a tornado, after wind speeds of approximately 135 m/s (300 mph) were recorded in both the 1999 Bridge Creek–Moore tornado and a sub-vortex within the 2013 El Reno tornado. Where the most intense winds are generally present in a tornado is an unresolved question, but the limited existing research suggests that wind speeds are likely to be highest closer to the ground. After the detection of the wind speeds, the quality of the data degraded until collection ceased altogether at 4:16 p.m., as the tornado turned to the east-northeast and towards I-40 where it would produce its most intense damage.

=== El Reno outskirts ===
When the tornado crossed I-40, the RaXPol radar 6.2 miles (10 km) away was still recording maximum radial velocities over 100 m/s (220 mph), 190 yards (170 m) above the ground. There, the tornado struck multiple people in their cars at EF3 strength. Three people—Terry Peoples, 50; Don Wesley Krug, 71; and Joan Krug, 67—were killed in two separate full-size pickup trucks, which were hurled thousands of feet from the road. Their bodies were found more than 300 yards (270 m) north of the interstate, outside their vehicles, stripped of clothing, and rendered "unrecognizable", according to responding state troopers. Several others were injured here as their vehicles were battered and overturned, including a truck driver whose semi truck was flipped. The interstate was left littered with pieces of cars. Two more fatalities in cars occurred just northeast of the interstate. According to the National Weather Service, the tornado is believed to have caused its maximum amount of damage just after crossing I-40.

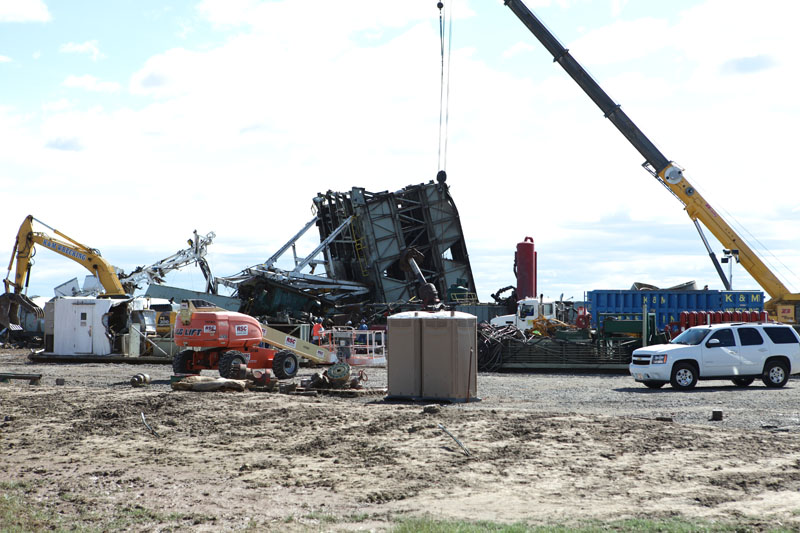
Damage at the Cactus 117 oil drilling rig near El Reno, showing the mangled and overturned rig

Just after crossing US 270, the tornado struck a complex of buildings (including a scrap yard, auto repair shop, garage, and grain storage facility) at EF3 intensity. The repair shop, the garage, and a farmhouse were destroyed, and the grain facility was "damaged beyond repair". Flying debris from the salvage yard impacted a new natural gas processing plant operated by Devon Energy, but all employees present avoided injury by sheltering on-site in time. The damage caused a major gas leak at the plant, which was not secured until nightfall. The tornado then quickly reached EF5 intensity as it struck the Cactus 117 oil drilling rig site at the corner of the Old 66 and North Courtney Road intersection, completely destroying it. When it hit, the rig's pipes and drill head were inserted deep in the well's borehole, which provided the drilling pipe with 200,000 lb (91,000 kg) of downforce. Despite this, and despite the fact that the drilling rig weighed 862 metric tons—or almost two million pounds—the rig was toppled onto its side and rolled several times. The well's blowout preventer was left bent at a 30-degree angle to the north. Elsewhere on the site, vehicles and cargo containers were lofted into the air and tossed.

Twelve workers were on the site when the tornado struck and took shelter in the site's change house (a steel container serving as a locker room). Tied down by four steel cables anchored 5.5 feet (1.7 m) deep in the ground, the container was pummeled with debris. One cable broke, and the container was dented, but all twelve workers survived without serious injury. The move to tie down change houses for tornado shelters at Cactus drilling rigs had come less than a year before the El Reno–Piedmont tornado, and following the storm Cactus moved to reinforce the change house roofs and position them where the rig would be less likely to topple on to them. Damage at the Cactus 117 rig amounted to $14 million.

...A TORNADO WARNING REMAINS IN EFFECT UNTIL 445 PM CDT FOR NORTHEASTERN CANADIAN COUNTY...

AT 431 PM CDT...A LARGE...VIOLENT TORNADO WAS LOCATED IN THE NORTHERN PARTS OF EL RENO...MOVING EAST-NORTHEAST AT 30 MPH. PERSONS IN EL RENO...PIEDMONT...AND NORTHERN YUKON NEED TO BE TAKING SHELTER! THIS IS A VERY DANGEROUS SITUATION!

LOCATIONS IN THE WARNING INCLUDE CONCHO...EL RENO...NORTHWESTERN OKLAHOMA CITY...OKARCHE...PIEDMONT AND RICHLAND.
$$

— National Weather Service Norman, Oklahoma, Severe Weather Statement, 4:32 p.m. CDT, May 24, 2011

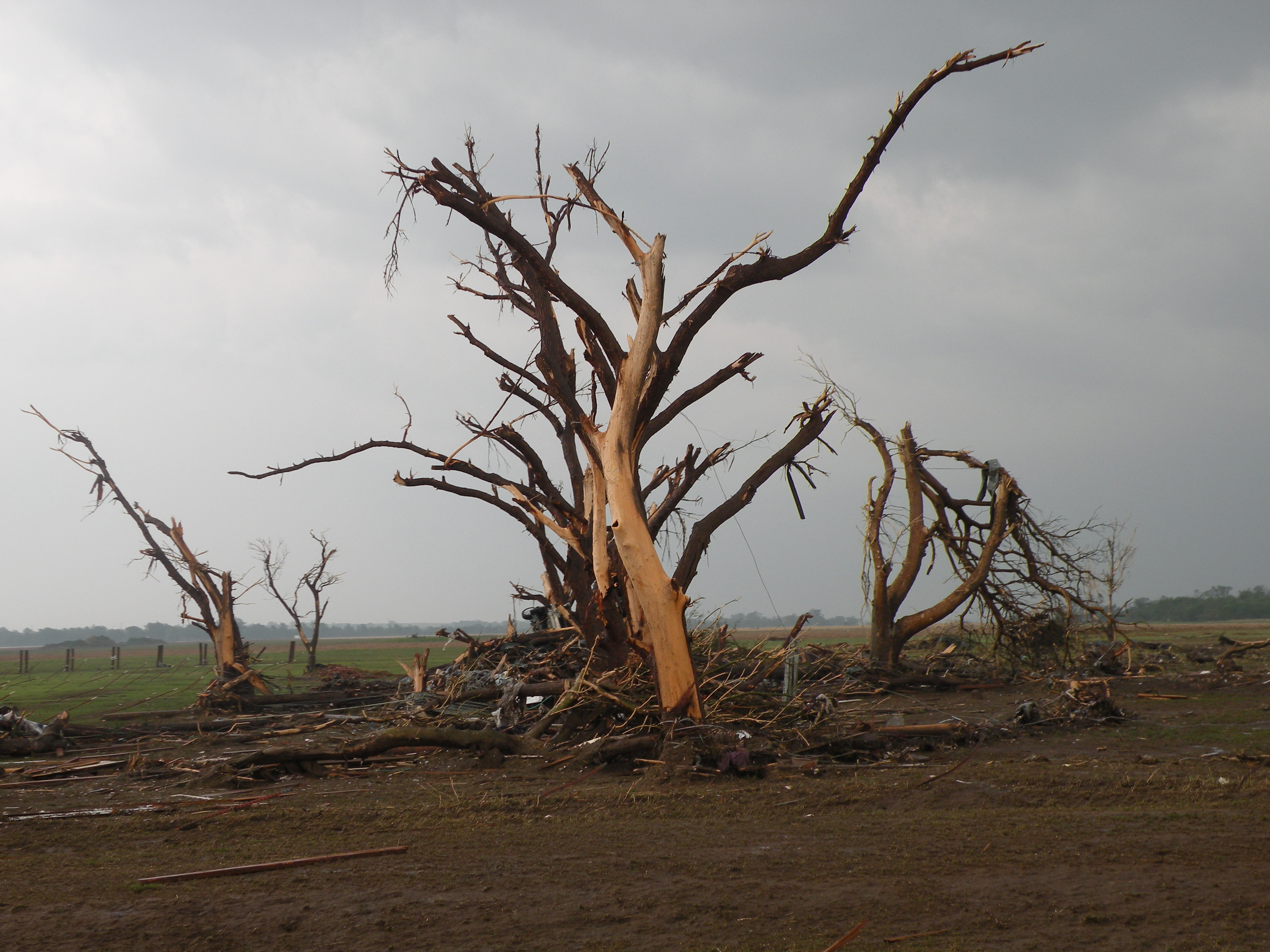
A debarked tree just north El Reno with various debris piled at its base and severe ground scouring in the foreground. The vehicle in background is speared to another tree.

After destroying the Cactus rig, the tornado continued moving east-northeast. The tornado then passed between Fort Reno and an Oklahoma Mesonet site, which recorded a sharp drop in atmospheric pressure, as well as a one-minute average wind speed of 115 mph (185 km/h) and a maximum wind gust of 151 mph (243 km/h) at 4:21 p.m. The gust was the highest wind speed ever recorded by the Oklahoma Mesonet. The site sustained only minor damage, the tornado likely having passed several hundred yards from it. Fort Reno sustained some structural damage. North of El Reno along US 81, two homes were struck: the first one was leveled at EF4 intensity and another one was swept completely away with debris being absent.

=== Satellite tornado observations ===
Leaving the environs of El Reno, the tornado then tracked through miles of mainly agricultural land. Widespread EF3 damage, pockmarked with areas of EF4 damage, was found between the towns of El Reno and Piedmont.

During the tornado's journey between El Reno and Piedmont, at least two satellite tornadoes were present at different times. The first was only recognized after the fact using radar data. That data shows the El Reno–Piedmont tornado and a separate cyclonic tornado, originating from the same mesocyclone, rotating in a counterclockwise fashion about a single common center (in a demonstration of the Fujiwhara effect) for several minutes, before merging at approximately 4:35 p.m. The second satellite came just minutes later. At 4:37 p.m., a Storm Prediction Center employee observed this separate vortex several miles northwest of Richland as it rotated around the main tornado for two minutes—only 50 yards (46 m) wide or so, it produced no damage that could be distinguished from that of the larger tornado, and was thus assigned a damage rating of EF0.

=== Piedmont to Guthrie regions ===
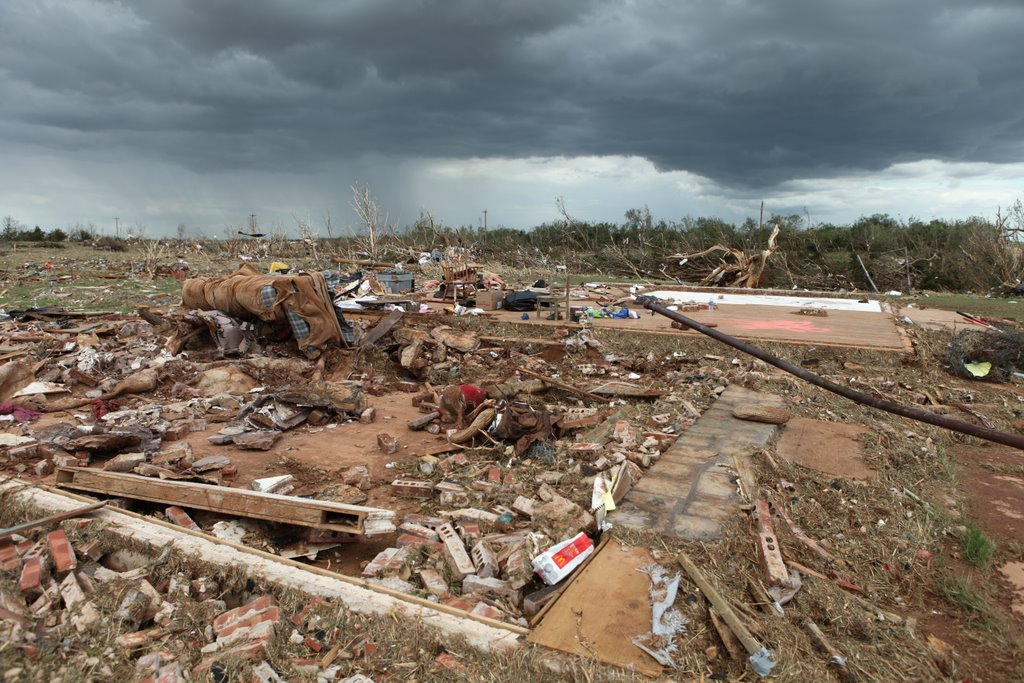
Debris from a house northeast of Piedmont struck by the tornado—this damage was given an EF4 rating

As the tornado neared Piedmont, it produced widespread EF4 damage north and west of the town. About three point one miles (5 km) north of Piedmont, the tornado leveled ten homes on Northridge Lane and rolled or lofted vehicles into nearby fields. However, surveys found that nails had been used to help fasten the walls to their concrete slab foundations, which failed and left broken portions of the slabs where they had been driven in. The tornado destroyed two more houses on Axeman Street, four miles (6.5 km) northeast of Piedmont. A Chevrolet Avalanche parked in the garage of one of the residences was hurled 710 yards (650 m) to the northeast and into a thicket of trees in a ravine, which were debarked and relieved of their branches. The Chevrolet's engine block and axles were found nearby, ripped from the car. The damage here was assigned an EF4 rating. In the subdivision of Falcon Lake, five miles (eight km) northeast of Piedmont and on the border of Canadian and Kingfisher Counties, multiple homes again had the walls removed from their concrete slab foundations. Vehicles were tossed into an adjacent lake. Two children (aged one and three years old) were killed in their home, which lacked a storm shelter. All told, the tornado destroyed 88 homes in the Piedmont area.

=== Weakening and dissipation ===
The tornado's intensity diminished somewhat as the tornado crossed into Kingfisher and Logan Counties, having already traveled just shy of 40 miles (64 km) on its track through Canadian County. EF2 and EF3 damage still occurred as the tornado damaged houses, destroyed multiple mobile homes, and collapsed high-voltage transmission towers, while continuing to debark trees to the point where only stumps remained. The tornado killed two more people—caught outside without shelter—near the community of Cashion. Along SH-74, the tornado destroyed three homes and an airplane hangar. The tornado approached Guthrie, but moved northwest of the town, which avoided a direct hit. The tornado finally dissipated northeast of Guthrie, producing only minor tree damage there.

The tornado's parent supercell went on to produce another tornado south of the community of Stillwater, which earned a damage rating of EF2.

=== Analysis ===
The tornado reached a maximum width of 1,760 yards (1,610 m), or over a mile wide at its peak. Its damage path was 63 miles (101 km) long. The tornado traversed this distance over the course of about one hour and 44 minutes, implying an average forward speed of approximately 36 miles per hour (58 km/h). On June 1, 2011, National Weather Service officials upgraded the tornado's preliminary EF4 rating to EF5 based on a combination of the damage to the Cactus 117 drilling rig site, the complete destruction of other buildings in the rig's vicinity, tossed vehicles, and the mobile Doppler radar data.

In the end, 22 tornadoes occurred in central Oklahoma during the El Reno–Piedmont tornado's parent outbreak. In the Oklahoma City area, five main supercells produced 12 tornadoes, three of them violent (EF4+). The El Reno–Piedmont tornado was the strongest of them all. The El Reno–Piedmont tornado became one of only 59 tornadoes ever rated F5 or EF5 to date, and one of only ten tornadoes to receive an EF5 rating since the advent of the Enhanced Fujita scale in 2007. It was the first tornado in Oklahoma to receive an EF5 rating, and the only one until the 2013 Moore tornado.

== Impacts ==
Following the tornado, first responders in Canadian County scoured the 10–20-square-mile (26–52 km^{2}) debris path in the corridor west of El Reno near the interstate. Three emergency operations centers were established in Canadian County near Piedmont, El Reno, and I-40.

=== Casualties ===
The El Reno–Piedmont tornado killed nine people and injured 181, making it responsible for the majority of the casualties caused by the entire outbreak (in which 11 died and 293 were injured). Of that total, seven deaths and 112 injuries occurred in Canadian County, 46 injuries occurred in Kingfisher County, and two deaths and 23 injuries occurred in Logan County. Three children with critical injuries in Piedmont numbered among the casualties in Canadian County.

In an overview of the outbreak in a paper presented at the annual American Meteorological Society conference, National Weather Service authors speculated that the relatively low number of fatalities during the outbreak (which involved three violent tornadoes near a major metropolitan area) was due in part due to "the incredible reaction of the community to not only watches and warnings, but also to the forecast of severe weather" on May 24.

=== Damage ===
The Devon Energy natural gas plant near El Reno was forced offline for several weeks as the company assessed and repaired the $140 million facility.

Though the amount of $14 million was given as the cost of damage to the Cactus 117 drilling rig site in news reports, a detailed monetary damage estimate by NWS/NOAA for the El Reno–Piedmont tornado was not made available. The only government assessment of damages appears in the tornado's entry in NOAA's NCEI Storm Events Database, which predicted that the total was "probably going to be well in the tens of millions". Meanwhile, insurance officials reported an estimated $200–300 million in total private property insured losses from the Oklahoma portion of the tornado outbreak.

The city of Piedmont paid $230,380 for debris removal, 75% of which was reimbursed by FEMA.

=== Political response ===
Governor of Oklahoma Mary Fallin declared a state of emergency in 68 counties on May 24, including Canadian, Kingfisher, and Logan Counties, before taking to the air to survey damage in several areas, which included Piedmont and Guthrie. On May 29, Governor Fallin requested that the White House issue a federal major disaster declaration for seven Oklahoma counties, again including Canadian, Kingfisher, and Logan Counties. On June 6, President Obama approved Governor Fallin's request for federal disaster relief.

In September 2011, Governor Fallin and state emergency management officials announced the SoonerSafe-Safe Room Rebate Program, using $1 million in FEMA funds, which distributed cash rebates via a statewide drawing to reimburse up to 500 Oklahomans seeking to build storm shelters. Victims of the May 24 tornado outbreak were among those who received priority selection for the rebates.

== See also ==
- Glossary of meteorology
- List of F5, EF5, and IF5 tornadoes
- Tornadoes of 2011
  - List of United States tornadoes in May 2011
