= Warning Decision Training Division =

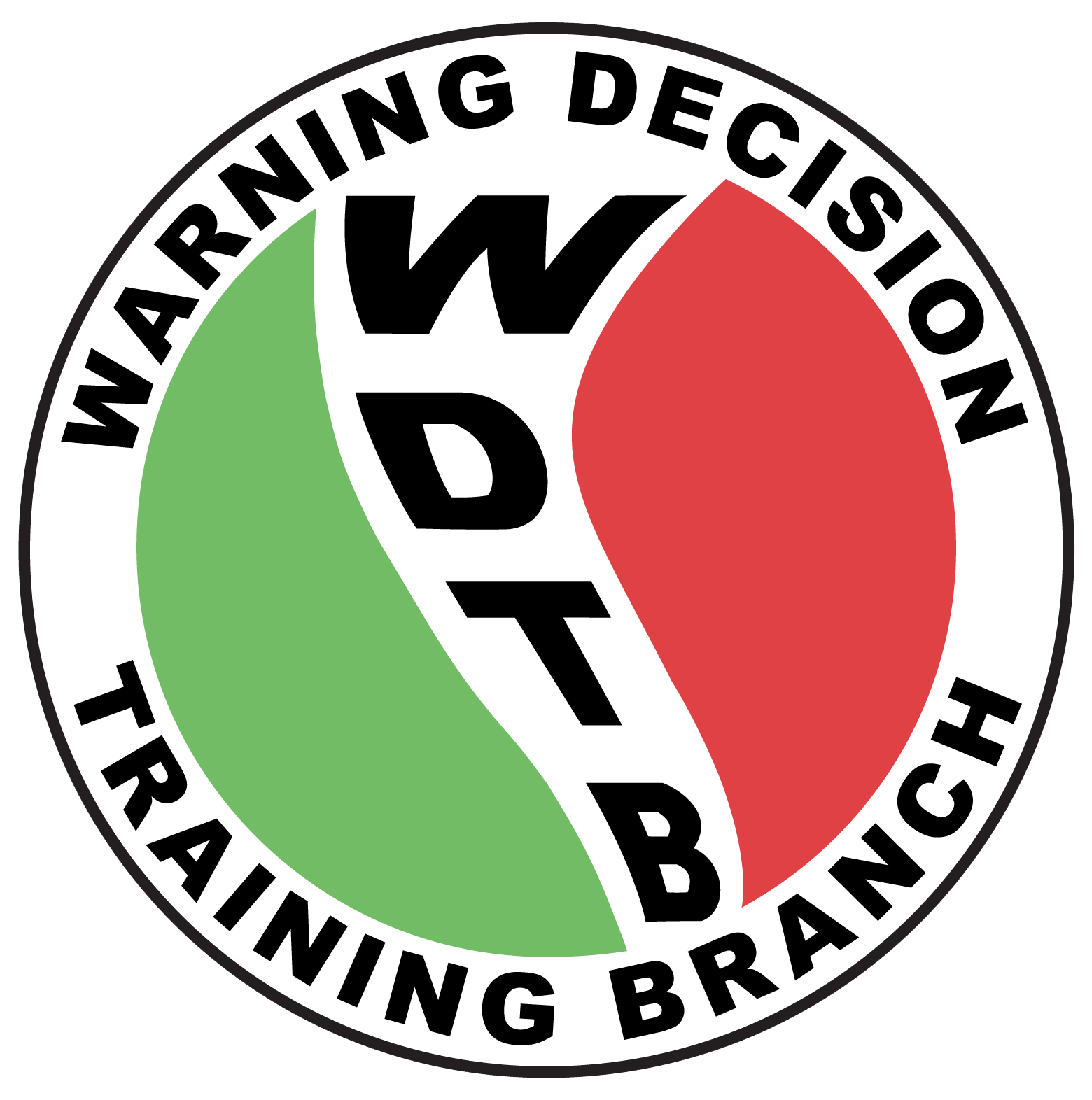

Agency overview
- Formed: 1989
- Jurisdiction: Federal government of the United States
- Headquarters: Norman, Oklahoma
- Agency executive: Ed Mahoney, Branch Chief
- Parent agency: NOAA
- Website: www.wdtb.noaa.gov

The Warning Decision Training Division (WDTD), known as the Warning Decision Training Branch until April 1, 2015, is one of three training organizations in the NWS Training Division which also includes the Forecast Decision Training Branch and the NWS Training Center. WDTD develops and delivers training on the integrated elements of the warning process within a National Oceanic and Atmospheric Administration (NOAA)/National Weather Service (NWS) forecast office. WDTD instructors develop and deliver a variety of in-residence, teletraining, and on-line asynchronous training content.

== History ==
=== NEXRAD Training Unit ===
With the nationwide implementation of the NEXRAD program, NWS management formed a training group designed to create and teach a course dedicated to the understanding and application of the WSR-88D radar. In the summer of 1989, this training group, called the Operations Training Facility (OTF) was staffed with six meteorologist instructors and a secretary (referred to as the NEXRAD Training Unit, or NTU). This facility was originally part of the NWS Forecast Office in Norman, OK and administered by the Southern Region of the NWS.

=== Operations Training Branch ===
In 1991, reorganization of the NWS led to the transfer of administration of NTU staff to the rapidly growing Operational Support Facility (OSF). After the transfer, the NTU/OTF became known as the Operations Training Branch (OTB), which is now known as the Radar Operations Center (ROC). Over the years, the training evolved and matured and eventually the course went from a five-week course taught by staff from UNISYS to an eighteen-day course taught exclusively by OTB instructors. Enrollment increased to the point that OTB staff were teaching three simultaneous classes with 24 students each including students from both NWS and Department of Defense (DoD). By 1993, there were 27 NWS and DoD instructors at OTB. In 1997, the last residence WSR-88D OPS Course was taught. During the seven years of residence classes, 2,525 students completed the OPS course. In 1998, the OTB was awarded the DoC Bronze Medal for the development and delivery of the WSR-88D OPS Course. The course had been recognized by NWS employees as an example of training done right in the NWS Modernization. Budgetary restrictions led OTB staff to start using a new training technique: Teletraining. By utilizing teletraining, and later other distance learning techniques and a one-week workshop, the old OPS course evolved into the Distance Learning Operations Course (DLOC).

=== Warning Decision Training Branch ===
In the fall of 2000, the NWS again transferred administrative control of the Operations Training Branch. This reorganization resulted in a new name, the Warning Decision Training Branch, and a new home in the Continuous Learning Division of the Office of Climate, Water, and Weather Services (OCWWS). As part of this second reorganization, DLOC and other training developed by WDTB transitioned from being "radar-centric" to "warning issuance-centric". In the summer of 2006, WDTB moved into its new home at the National Weather Center (NWC) on the University of Oklahoma (OU) south research campus.

=== Warning Decision Training Division ===
Effective at the end of March 2015, NWS headquarters was reorganized and the Warning Decision Training Branch became the Warning Decision Training Division.

== Notes ==
This article incorporates public domain material from the National Weather Service
