= National Weather Service Training Center =

The National Weather Service Training Center (NWSTC) provides initial and continuing education to NOAA/NWS employees in the areas of equipment (operations, maintenance and repair), management, meteorology, hydrology, systems support, and related activities. NWSTC's staff develop and deliver courses in a number of formats including residence classes and workshops, web-based and computer-based self-study tutorials, teletraining (interactive web delivery), and work aids. It is located in Kansas City, Missouri.

In addition, NWSTC staff provides consulting services, research and development (R&D), technical and operational documentation assistance, and system deployment support. The NWSTC Leadership Academy also offers leadership training to all federal agencies.

NWSTC's goal is to teach job-specific and practical skills; integrate systems so the whole, instead of individual parts of the problem, can be recognized; emulate the NWS working field environment; and provide students the ability to work and experiment with concepts or equipment as part of learning.

NWSTC's mission is to align the training of NOAA/NWS employees with the advancement of science and technology for NOAA to earn the public's trust and perform with service-based excellence.

== See also ==
- Forecast Decision Training Branch (FDTB)
- Warning Decision Training Branch (WDTB)
- Radar Operations Center (ROC)
