= Radar Operations Center =

American National Weather Service unit

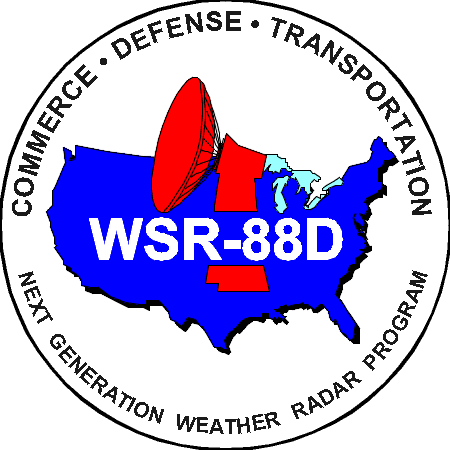

Agency overview
- Formed: 1988
- Preceding agency: Operational Support Facility (OSF)
- Jurisdiction: United States federal government
- Headquarters: Norman, Oklahoma, U.S. 35.237522°N 97.460983°W
- Parent department: Department of Commerce
- Parent agency: National Weather Service
- Website: roc.noaa.gov

The Radar Operations Center (ROC) is a National Weather Service (NWS) unit that coordinates the development, maintenance, and training for the NEXRAD weather radar network. It is located near the University of Oklahoma Westheimer Airport in Norman, Oklahoma, and run by the National Oceanic and Atmospheric Administration (NOAA) in the Department of Commerce with partners at the Department of Defense and the Department of Transportation.

ROC consists of four branches: Engineering, Field Requirements, Operations, and Program. ROC also works with the Federal Aviation Administration's Terminal Doppler Weather Radar (TDWR) network.

== See also ==
- NOAA under the second presidency of Donald Trump
- Warning Decision Training Division (WDTD)
- National Weather Service Training Center (NWSTC)
- National Severe Storms Laboratory (NSSL)
