= MESO-SAILS =

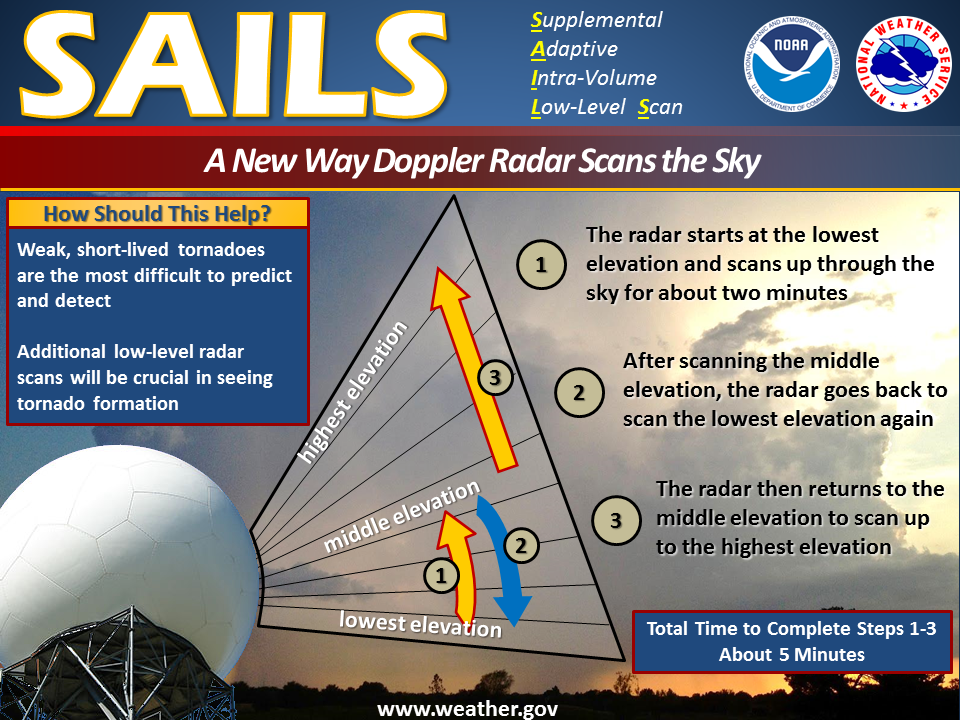
SAILS concept.

Multiple Elevation Scan Option for Supplemental Adaptive Intra-Volume Low-Level Scan (abbreviated MESO-SAILS), is a dynamic scanning option for the WSR-88D, controllable by the operator of the radar, when in VCP mode 12 and 212, and additionally 35 and 215 with the Build 18 update scheduled for October 2017. When active, anywhere from one to three supplemental low-level scans can be added to any volume, increasing overall low-level data availability and improves general severe weather detection, as needed. When active, per the National Weather Service, low-level updates will be available "every 75 to 90 seconds".

== Concept ==
WSR-88D radars scan a number of elevation angles to scan the atmosphere around the site. The number of angles and the length of each scan depend on the meteorological situation (no precipitation, scattered, generalized, or deep convective precipitation). These schemes are called Volume Coverage Patterns (VCP).

The more angles scanned, the longer between scans at the lowest elevation. Data at that level can be crucial in summer thunderstorm situations when Doppler patterns for rotations and windshifts, as well as dual polarized information, are indicative of severe weather like tornadoes. Shortening the time between two scans at low level is therefore an important factor for convective storm detection. The first step of this program is SAILS (Supplemental Adaptive Intra-Volume Low-Level Scan) which inserts an extra scan of the elevation defined in the VCP definition (normally 0.5°). This is done by forcing the antenna to go back down to the base elevation after scanning a certain number elevations up to the "middle" of the atmosphere, this "middle" elevation being dependent of the VCP used. Doing this provides two low-level scans for each total volume scan while only adding 30 to 35 seconds to the total scan.

To increase the number of low-level scans, one can redo the same process as SAILS many times: MESO-SAILS (Multiple Elevation Scan Option for SAILS). These additional supplemental low-level elevation scans are evenly spaced, in time (as close as possible given the defined VCP rotation rates), throughout the volume scan. The radar operator may choose 1 to 3 extra scans, depending on the weather situation. This lengthens the time of the total scan but provide low-level coverage more often.

== History and deployment ==
During the summer of 2013, the Radar Operations Center, in order to facilitate "proof of concept" testing of MESO-SAILS, defined two VCPs that were based on VCP-12 that included hardcoded additional low-level split-cut scans. For the first testing, which commenced on June 26, 2013, SAILSx2 (2 supplemental low-level soundings) was executed for approximately 4 1/2 hours, and during the testing a radar technician observed the behavior of the pedestal/antenna assembly. No excessive wear was noted to the assembly of the KOUN radar in Norman, Oklahoma.

Two days later, June 28, 2013, SAILSx3 (3 supplemental low-level soundings) was executed, also within the KOUN RPG. During this 1 1/2-hour test of SAILSx3, a ROC radar hardware engineer accompanied the ROC electronics maintenance technician to observe the antenna/pedestal assembly. Again, no excessive wear was noted.

MESO-SAILS was thus deployed with Build 14 update in the spring of 2014 and is still in operations when needed. The operator can choose between 1, 2, or 3 supplemental low-level scans with MESO-SAILS active.

== MESO-SAILS in tornado cases ==
A study published in 2016 looked at how the MESO-SAILS radar scanning regime performed with respect to tornado debris signature (TDS) detection during the 2016 tornado season in the Iowa Region, compared to the distribution before its implementation. When tornado watches were active, MESO-SAILS was active 100% reflecting the National Weather Service expectations for such situations. Overall, it was found that the use of MESO-SAILS led to an enhancement in detection and possibly an increased effective range at which TDSs could be detected. The use of MESO-SAILS dropped to 41% during severe thunderstorms watches however, which may suggest some benefit in keeping MESO-SAILS active during severe thunderstorm watches as well.

== Bibliography ==
- Daniel, Amy E.; Chrisman, Joe N.; Smith, Steven D.; Miller, Michael W. (February 5, 2014). New WSR-88D Operational Techniques: Responding to recent Weather Events (PDF). 30th Conference on Environmental Information Processing Technologies. Atlanta, GA: AMS.
  - Amy E. Daniel; J. N. Chrisman; C. A. Ray; S. D. Smith; M. W. Miller. "5.2 New WSR-88D Operational Techniques: Responding to Recent Weather Events". American Meteorological Society (Abstract).
- Edwards, Roger; Picca, Joseph C. Tornadic Debris Signatures in Tropical Cyclones (PDF). Preprints, 28th Conf. Severe Local Storms. No. P162. Portland, OR.
- Tuftedal, Kristofer S. (December 2016). Radar Detection of Tornadogenesis (pdf) (Thesis). Iowa State University. doi:10.31274/mteor_stheses-180813-2. hdl:20.500.12876/55813.
- Porter, Chris (September 17, 2015). Recent challenges and opportunities for operational radar algorithms afforded by the NEXRAD radar network. 37th Conference on Radar Meteorology. AMS.
