= SMART-R =

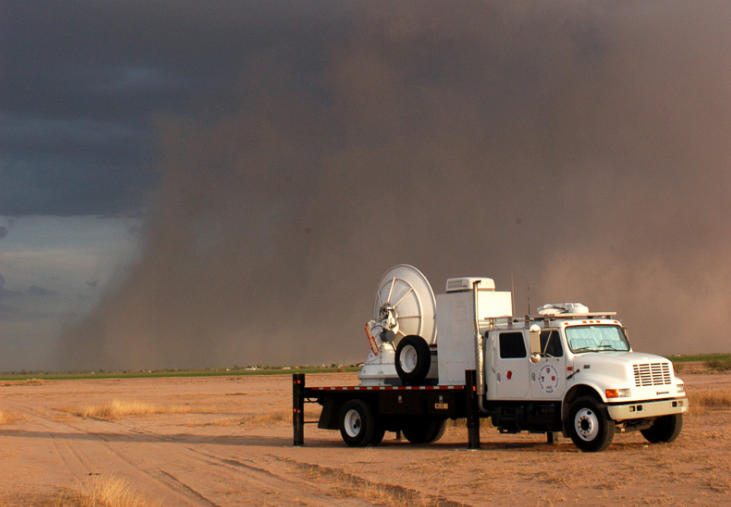
- SR-1 sampling a haboob in Arizona.
- Country of origin: USA
- No. built: 2
- Type: Weather radar
- Frequency: 5635 MHz (SR-1); 5612.82 MHz (SR-2) (C-Band)
- Beamwidth: 1.5°
- Pulsewidth: 0.2 to 2.0 μs
- RPM: 0-33 deg s^{−1}
- Diameter: 2.5 m
- Elevation: 0°-90°
- Other names: SR

The Shared Mobile Atmospheric Research and Teaching Radar, colloquially known as SMART-R or SR, is a mobile Doppler weather radar platform operated and created by University of Oklahoma (OU) with aide from Texas A&M and Texas Tech University in 2001.

== Development ==
Throughout the early and late 1990s, several mobile radar concepts came to be, often involving high frequency X-band radars which suffer significant attenuation, and often lack in range. Ideally, these radars would serve as research and observation platforms, covering regions scarcely covered by the NEXRAD network as a whole. One such concept later went on to become the Doppler On Wheels, now a fleet of 3 operational vehicles.

In order to counteract the problems previously described with high frequency radars, two decommissioned WSR-74 radars, originally used for local warnings, were acquired by TAMU. These two radars, both operating in the C-band, are less susceptible to attenuation in precipitation and have overall greater ranges for doppler products. Throughout the rest of the 90s and into 2000, development of the first SMART-R, SR-1, began. During development, a fire in the garage housing SR-1 broke out, destroying the truck and several components. Much of the radar survived, however, and the project continued with the completion of SR-1 in late 2001. Following this, SR-2 was assembled and eventually completed in 2004.

== Characteristics ==
All listed characteristics will apply to both SRs. The operating maximum power for SR is 250 kW. The highest operating frequency for SR is 5,635 MHz - falling into the C-band. With a 2.5 m center-fed parabolic antenna, the gain is approximately 40 dB. Moreover, half power beamwidth is approximately 1.5°.

== Deployments ==
Since the inception of the project, both SMART-Rs have performed field research in various regions of the United States, including hurricane research, and haboob intensification studies. Both SMART-Rs have sampled tornadic supercells across the plains, taking part in projects such as VORTEX-2 and VORTEX-SE. Given the SR platform consists of two individual radars, projects are often arranged in what is known as a dual-doppler setup, whereas two radars are located at different locations in varying orientations so as to maximize wind retrieval accuracy.
