= NEXRAD =

Network of weather radars operated by the NWS

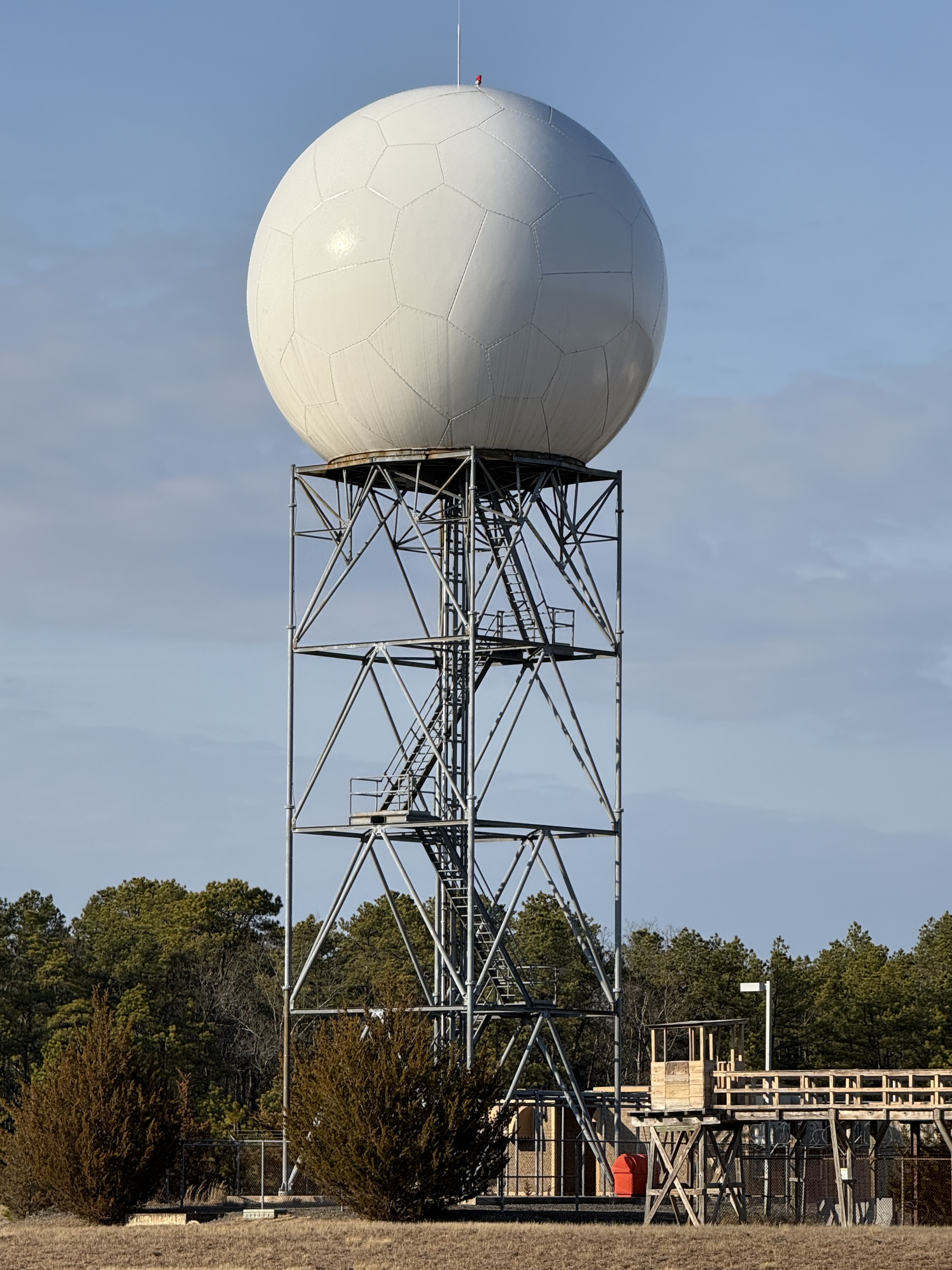
- NEXRAD Radar at Fort Dix in New Jersey
- Country of origin: United States
- Introduced: 1988
- No. built: 158 in the US, Puerto Rico, Guam, and South Korea
- Type: Weather radar
- Frequency: 2,700 to 3,000 MHz (S band)
- PRF: 320 to 1,300 Hz (according to VCP)
- Beamwidth: 0.96° with 2.7 GHz; 0.88° with 3.0 GHz
- Pulsewidth: 1.57 to 4.57 μs (according to VCP)
- RPM: 3
- Range: 460 km for reflectivity 230 km for Doppler velocity
- Diameter: 8.54 m (28.0 ft)
- Azimuth: 0 to 360º
- Elevation: -1° to +20° (operations) up to +60° (test)
- Power: 750 KW
- Other names: WSR-88D

The WSR-88D (Weather Surveillance Radar, 1988, Doppler), commonly known as NEXRAD (Next Generation Radar), is a high-resolution S-band Doppler weather radar deployed across the United States, Puerto Rico, Guam and South Korea as a network of 158 radar units individually operated by the National Weather Service (NWS), the Federal Aviation Administration (FAA), and the United States Air Force (USAF). The NEXRAD network as a whole is supported by the Radar Operations Center (ROC).

The WSR-88D detects precipitation and atmospheric movement or wind. It returns data which when processed can be displayed in a mosaic map which shows patterns of precipitation and its movement. The radar system operates in two basic modes, selectable by the operator – a slow-scanning clear-air mode for analyzing air movements when there is little or no activity in the area, and a precipitation mode, with a faster scan for tracking active weather. The WSR-88D has an increased emphasis on automation, including the use of algorithms and automated volume scans.

== Deployment ==
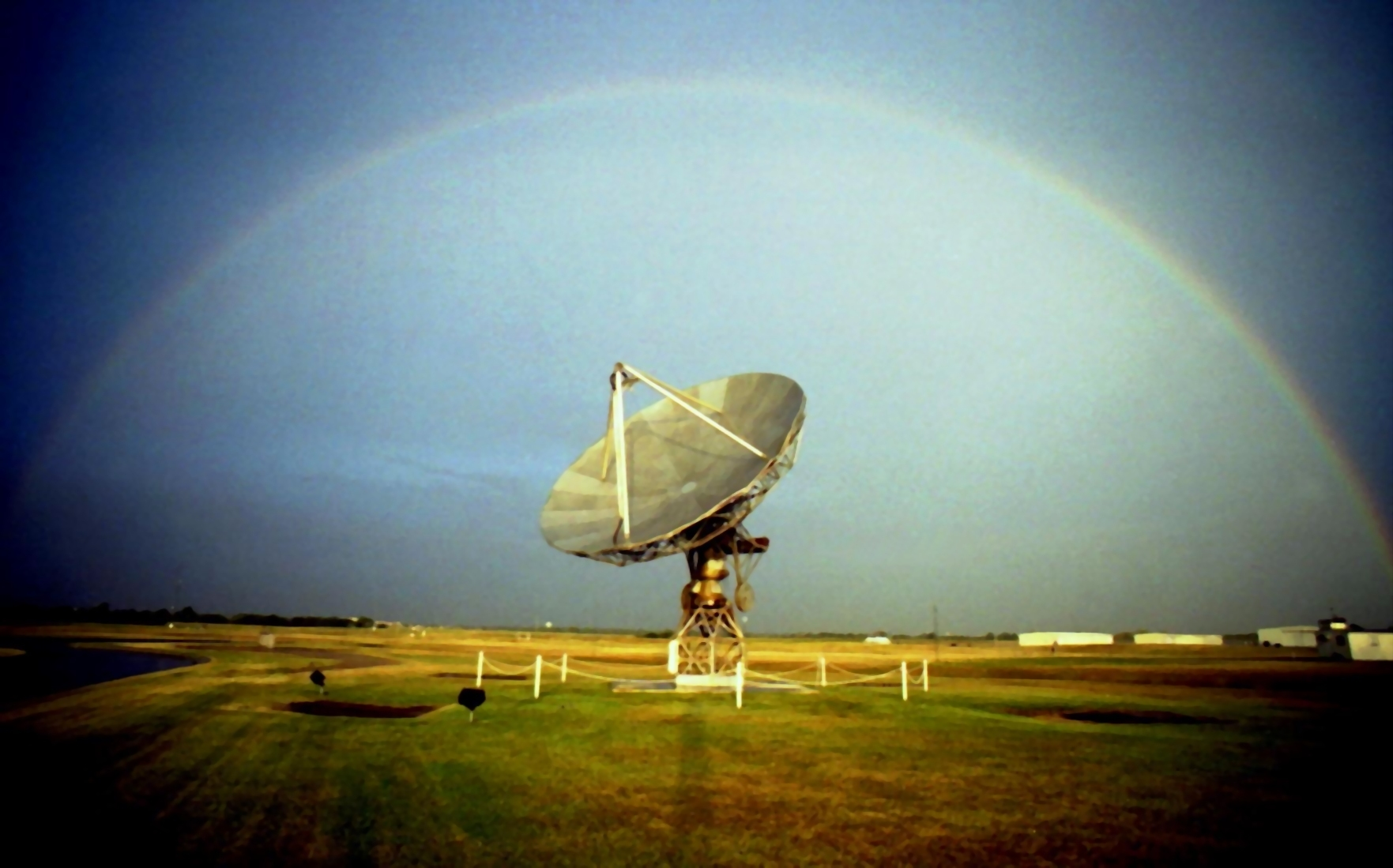
Testbed of the WSR-88D on display at the National Severe Storms Laboratory.

In the 1970s, the U.S. Departments of Commerce, Defense, and Transportation, agreed that to better serve their operational needs, the existing national radar network needed to be replaced. The radar network consisted of WSR-57 developed in 1957, and WSR-74 developed in 1974. Neither system employed Doppler technology, which provides wind speed and direction information.

The Joint Doppler Operational Project (JDOP) was formed in 1976 at the National Severe Storms Laboratory (NSSL) to study the usefulness of using Doppler weather radar to identify severe and tornadic thunderstorms. Tests over the next three years, conducted by the National Weather Service and the Air Weather Service agency of the U.S. Air Force, found that Doppler radar provided much improved early detection of severe thunderstorms. A working group that included the JDOP published a paper providing the concepts for the development and operation of a national weather radar network. In 1979, the NEXRAD Joint System Program Office (JSPO) was formed to move forward with the development and deployment of the proposed NEXRAD radar network. That year, the NSSL completed a formal report on developing the NEXRAD system.

When the proposal was presented to the Reagan administration, two options were considered to build the radar systems: allow corporate bids to build the systems based on the schematics of the previously developed prototype radar or seek contractors to build their own systems using predetermined specifications. The JSPO group opted to select a contractor to develop and produce the radars that would be used for the national network. Radar systems developed by Raytheon and Unisys were tested during the 1980s. However, it took four years to allow the prospective contractors to develop their proprietary models. Unisys was selected as the contractor, and was awarded a full-scale production contract in January 1990.

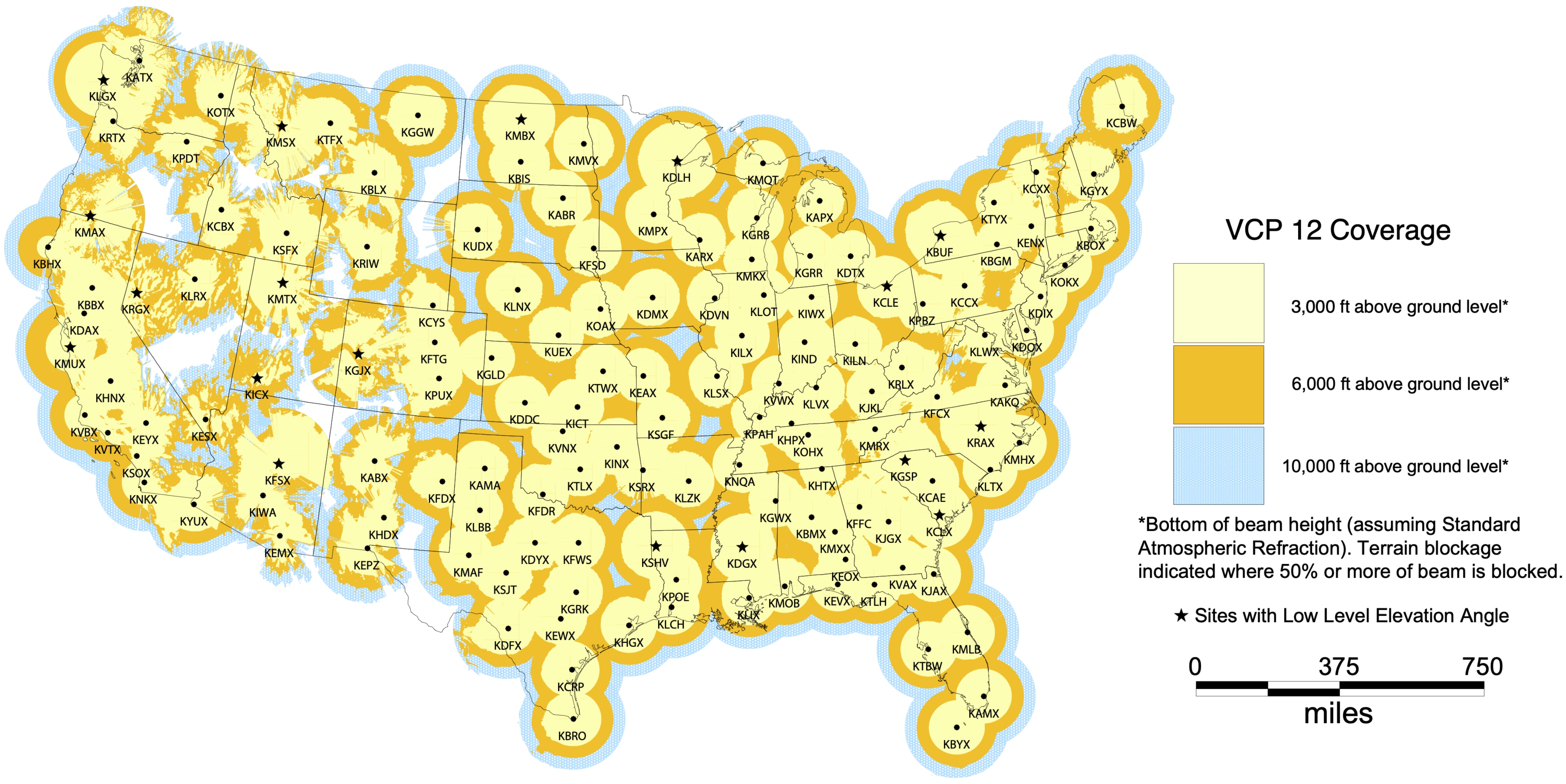
NEXRAD sites within the Contiguous U.S.

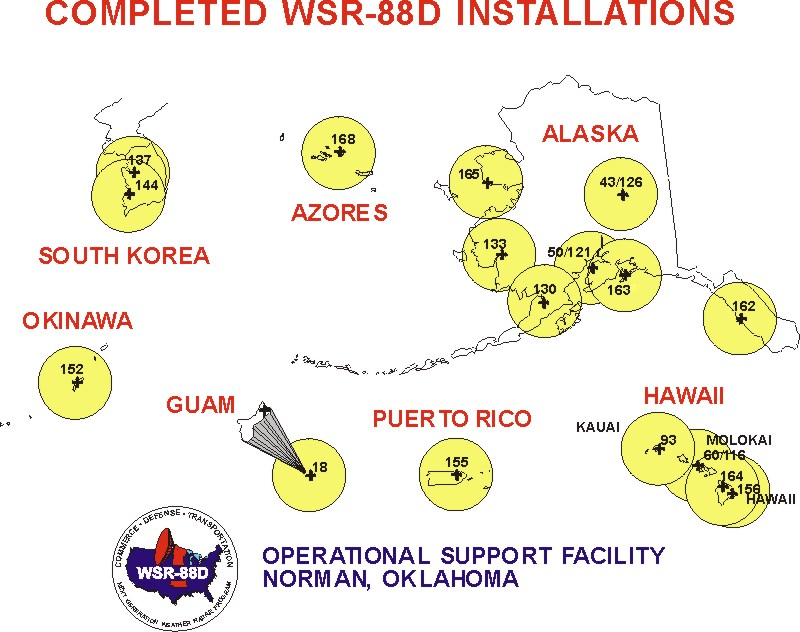
NEXRAD sites in Alaska, Hawaii, U.S. territories, and military bases.

Installation of an operational prototype was completed in the fall of 1990 in Norman, Oklahoma. The first installation of a WSR-88D for operational use in daily forecasting was in Sterling, Virginia on June 12, 1992. The last system deployed as part of the installation program was installed in North Webster, Indiana on August 30, 1997. In 2011, the new Langley Hill NEXRAD was added at Langley Hill, Washington to better cover the Pacific Coast of that area; other radars also filled gaps in coverage at Evansville, Indiana and Ft. Smith, Arkansas, following the initial installations. The site locations were strategically chosen to provide overlapping coverage between radars in case one failed during a severe weather event. Where possible, they were co-located with NWS Weather Forecast Offices (WFOs) to permit quick access by maintenance technicians.

The NEXRAD radars incorporated a number of improvements over the radar systems that were previously in use. The new system provided Doppler velocity, improving tornado prediction ability by detecting rotation present within the storm at different scan angles. It provided improved resolution and sensitivity, enabling operators to see features such as cold fronts, thunderstorm gust fronts, and mesoscale to even storm scale features of thunderstorms that had never been visible on radar. The NEXRAD radars also provided volumetric scans of the atmosphere allowing operators to examine the vertical structure of storms and could act as wind profilers by providing detailed wind information for several kilometers above the radar site. The radars also had a much increased range allowing detection of weather events at much greater distances from the radar site.

WSR-88D development, maintenance, and training are coordinated by the NEXRAD Radar Operations Center (ROC) located on the grounds of the University of Oklahoma Westheimer Airport (KOUN) in Norman, Oklahoma.

The University of Louisiana at Monroe in Monroe, Louisiana operates a "WSR-88D clone" radar that is used by local National Weather Service offices in Shreveport, Little Rock and Jackson to fill gaps in NEXRAD coverage in northeastern Louisiana, southeastern Arkansas and western Mississippi. However, the radar's status as being part of the NEXRAD network is disputed.

== Radar properties ==
A standard WSR-88D operates in the S band, at a frequency of around 2800 MHz, with a typical gain around 53 dB using a center-fed parabolic antenna. The pulse repetition frequency (PRF) varies from 318 to 1300 Hz with a maximum power output of 700 kW at Klystron output, although dependent on the volume coverage pattern (VCP) selected by the operator. All NEXRADs have a dish diameter of 9.1 m (30 ft) and an aperture diameter of 8.5 m (28 ft). Using the predetermined VCPs, NEXRADs have a traditional elevation minimum and maximum ranging from 0.1 to 19.5 degrees, although the non-operational minimum and maximum spans from −1 to +45 degrees. Unlike its predecessor, the WSR-74, the antenna can not be manually steered by the operator. WSR-88D Level I data is the recorded output of the digital receiver. Spatial resolution varies with data type and scan angle – level III data has a resolution of 1 km x 1 degree in azimuth, while super-res level II, (implemented in 2008 nationwide), has a resolution of 250m by 0.5 degrees in azimuth below 2.4 degrees in elevation.

== Scan strategies ==
The NEXRAD radar system continually refreshes its three-dimensional database via one of several predetermined scan patterns. These patterns have differing PRFs to fit the respective use, but all have a constant resolution. Since the system samples the atmosphere in three dimensions, there are many variables that can be changed, depending on the desired output. With all traditional VCPs, the antenna scans at a maximum of 19.5 degrees in elevation, and a minimum of .5, with some coastal sites scanning as low as .2 or lower. Due to the incomplete elevation coverage, a phenomenon known as "The Cone of Silence" is present with all NEXRAD radars. The term describes the lack of coverage directly above the radar sites.

There are currently seven Volume Coverage Patterns (VCP) available to NWS meteorologists, with an eighth in the process of replacing one of the existing seven. Each VCP is a predefined set of instructions that control antenna rotation speed, elevation angle, transmitter pulse repetition frequency and pulse width. The radar operator chooses from the VCPs based on the type of weather occurring:

- Clear Air or Light Precipitation: VCP 31, 34, and 35
- Shallow Precipitation: VCP 35, 112, and 215
- Non-Tropical Convection: VCP 12, 212, and 215
- Tropical System Convection: VCP 212, 215, and 112

VCP	Scan time (min)	Elevation scans	Elevation angles (°)	Usage	SAILS available?
12	4.2	14	0.5, 0.9, 1.3, 1.8, 2.4, 3.1, 4, 5.1, 6.4, 8, 10, 12.5, 15.6, 19.5	Severe weather, including tornadoes, located closer to the radar (within 85 miles for storms traveling up to 55 MPH, but shorter distances for faster-moving precipitation)	Yes (up to three per volume scan)
212	4.5	14	0.5, 0.9, 1.3, 1.8, 2.4, 3.1, 4, 5.1, 6.4, 8, 10, 12.5, 15.6, 19.5	Severe weather, including tornadoes, over 70 miles away from the radar, or widespread severe convection. Best VCP for MRLE use. Completion time for VCP 212 + 1 SAILS scan is similar to VCP 12 + 2 SAILS scans	Yes (up to three per volume scan)
112	5.5	14	0.5, 0.9, 1.3, 1.8, 2.4, 3.1, 4, 5.1, 6.4, 8, 10, 12.5, 15.6, 19.5	Variant of VCP 212 designed for tropical systems and strong, non-severe wind shear events. Uses a combination of MPDA and SZ-2 to form a contiguous velocity display. MRLE use is not possible with this VCP	Yes (up to one per volume scan)
215	6	15	0.5, 0.9, 1.3, 1,8, 2.4, 3.1, 4, 5.1, 6.4, 8, 10, 12, 14, 16.7, 19.5	General-purpose precipitation, including tropical systems capable of producing tornadoes. Most vertical resolution of any VCP	Yes (up to one per volume scan)
31	10	5	0.5, 1.5, 2.4, 3.4, 4.3	Long-pulse clear air mode designed for maximum sensitivity. Excellent for detecting light snow or subtle boundaries. Prone to detecting ground clutter. May be prone to detecting virga. To be replaced by VCP 34.	No
34	10	5	0.5, 1.5, 2.4, 3.4, 4.3	Long-pulse VCP designed with maximum sensitivity for clear-air, snow, and light stratiform precipitation. Uses common and overlapping low elevation angles.	Yes (up to one per volume scan)
34	9	7	0.5, 0.9, 1.3, 1.8, 2.4, 3.1, 4.5	Long-pulse VCP designed with maximum sensitivity for clear-air, snow, and light stratiform precipitation. Uses common and overlapping low elevation angles.	Yes (up to one per volume scan)
35	7	7	0.5, 0.9, 1.3, 1,8, 2.4, 3.1, 4, 5.1, 6.4	Short-pulse clear air VCP designed for scattered to widespread light to moderate precipitation from non-convective cloudforms, especially nimbostratus. Not recommended for convection, except for pop-up thundershowers produced by Cumulus congestus clouds located 30 miles or more away from the radar	Yes (up to one per volume scan)

The specific VCP currently in use at each NEXRAD site is available.

== Enhancements ==
=== Super resolution ===
Deployed from March to August 2008 with all level II data, the Super Resolution upgrade permitted the capability of the radar to produce much higher resolution data. Under legacy resolution, the WSR-88D provides reflectivity data at 1 km (0.62 mi) by 1 degree to 460 km (290 mi) range, and velocity data at 0.25 km (0.16 mi) by 1 degree to a range of 230 km (140 mi). Super Resolution provides reflectivity data with a sample size of 0.25 km (0.16 mi) by 0.5 degree, and increase the range of Doppler velocity data to 300 km (190 mi). Initially, the increased resolution is only available in the lower scan elevations. Super resolution makes a compromise of slightly decreased noise reduction for a large gain in resolution.

The improvement in azimuthal resolution increases the range at which tornadic mesoscale rotations can be detected. This allows for faster lead time on warnings and extends the useful range of the radar. The increased resolution (in both azimuth and range) increases the detail of such rotations, giving a more accurate representation of the storm. Along with providing better detail of detected precipitation and other mesoscale features, Super Resolution also provides additional detail to aid in other severe storm analysis. Super Resolution extends the range of velocity data and provides it faster than before, also allowing for faster lead time on potential tornado detection and subsequent warnings.

=== Dual polarization ===
Non-Polarimetric Radar

Polarimetric Radar

WSR-88D sites across the nation have been upgraded to polarimetric radar, which adds a vertical polarization to the traditional horizontally polarized radar waves, in order to more accurately discern what is reflecting the signal. This so-called dual polarization allows the radar to distinguish between rain, hail, and snow, something the horizontally polarized radars cannot accurately do. Early trials showed that rain, ice pellets, snow, hail, birds, insects, and ground clutter all have different signatures with dual polarization, which could mark a significant improvement in forecasting winter storms and severe thunderstorms. The deployment of the dual polarization capability (Build 12) to NEXRAD sites began in 2010 and was completed by the summer of 2013. The radar at Vance Air Force Base in Enid, Oklahoma was the first operational WSR-88D modified to utilize dual polarization technology. The modified radar went into operation on March 3, 2011.

=== AVSET ===
When the NEXRAD system was initially implemented, the radar automatically scanned all scan angles in a Volume Coverage Pattern, even if the highest scan angles were free of precipitation. As a result, in many cases when severe weather was farther from the radar site, forecasters could not provide as timely severe weather warnings as possible. The Automated Volume Scan Evaluation and Termination (AVSET) algorithm helps solve this problem by immediately ending the volume scan when precipitation returns at higher scan angles drop below a set threshold (around 20 dBZ). This can often allow for more volume scans per hour, improving severe weather detection without the need for hardware upgrades AVSET was initially deployed in RPG build 12.3, in Fall of 2011.

=== SAILS and MESO-SAILS ===
One of the primary weaknesses of the WSR-88D radar system was the lack of frequency of base (0.5 degree) scans, especially during severe weather. Forecasters, and TV viewers at home, often had access to images that were four or five minutes old, and therefore had inaccurate information. TV viewers at home could be lulled into a false sense of security that a tornado was farther away from them than it really was, endangering residents in the storm's path. The Supplemental Adaptive Intra-Volume Low-Level Scan (SAILS) technique, deployed with Build 14 in the first half of 2014, allows operators the option to run an additional base scan during the middle of a typical volume scan. With one SAILS cut active on VCP 212, base scans occur about once every two and a half minutes, with more frequent updates if AVSET terminates the volume scan early.

Multiple Elevation Scan Option for Supplemental Adaptive Intra-Volume Low-Level Scan (MESO-SAILS) is an enhancement to SAILS, which allows the radar operator to run one, two or three additional base scans during the course of a volume scan, per the operators request. During June 2013, the Radar Operations Center first tested SAILSx2, which adds two additional low-level scans per volume. It was executed for approximately 4.5 hours and during the testing, an Electronics Technician observed the pedestal/antenna assembly's behavior. No excessive wear was noted. Two days later, SAILSx3 was executed, which added 3 additional low-level scans to a volume. During this 1.5 hour test of SAILSx3, a ROC Radar Hardware Engineer accompanied the ROC Electronics Technician to observe the antenna/pedestal assembly. Again, no excessive wear was noted. MESO-SAILS was deployed with Build 16.1, in spring of 2016.

=== MRLE ===
Mid-Volume Rescan of Low-Level Elevations (colloquially known as MRLE) is a dynamic scanning option for the WSR-88D derived from MESO-SAILS, a separate scanning option implemented in NEXRAD RPG 14.0, in the Spring of 2014.

During quasi-linear convective systems (QLCS), colloquially known as squall lines, the detection of mesovortices, which generate at 4,000 to 8,000 feet above ground level, is not always possible with SAILS cuts, as the base 0.5 degree scan travels below the formation of mesovortices at closer distances to the radar. MRLE consecutively scans either the two, three or four lowest scan angles during the middle of a typical volume scan, allowing more frequent surveillance of mesovortex formation during QLCS events. MRLE will be deployed on a non-operational basis in RPG 18.0 in spring of 2018, with possible operational deployment with RPG 19.0, if proven useful or of importance.

Deployment was anticipated by the Radar Operations Center to commence in October 2017, along with the RPG 18.0 build, on a non-operational basis. The scanning option will only be available for use with Volume Coverage Patterns 21, 12, 212, and additionally 215. If proven to be significant in terms of warning dissemination, MRLE will deploy operationally nationwide with RPG 18.0, planned for 2018.

==== Concept ====
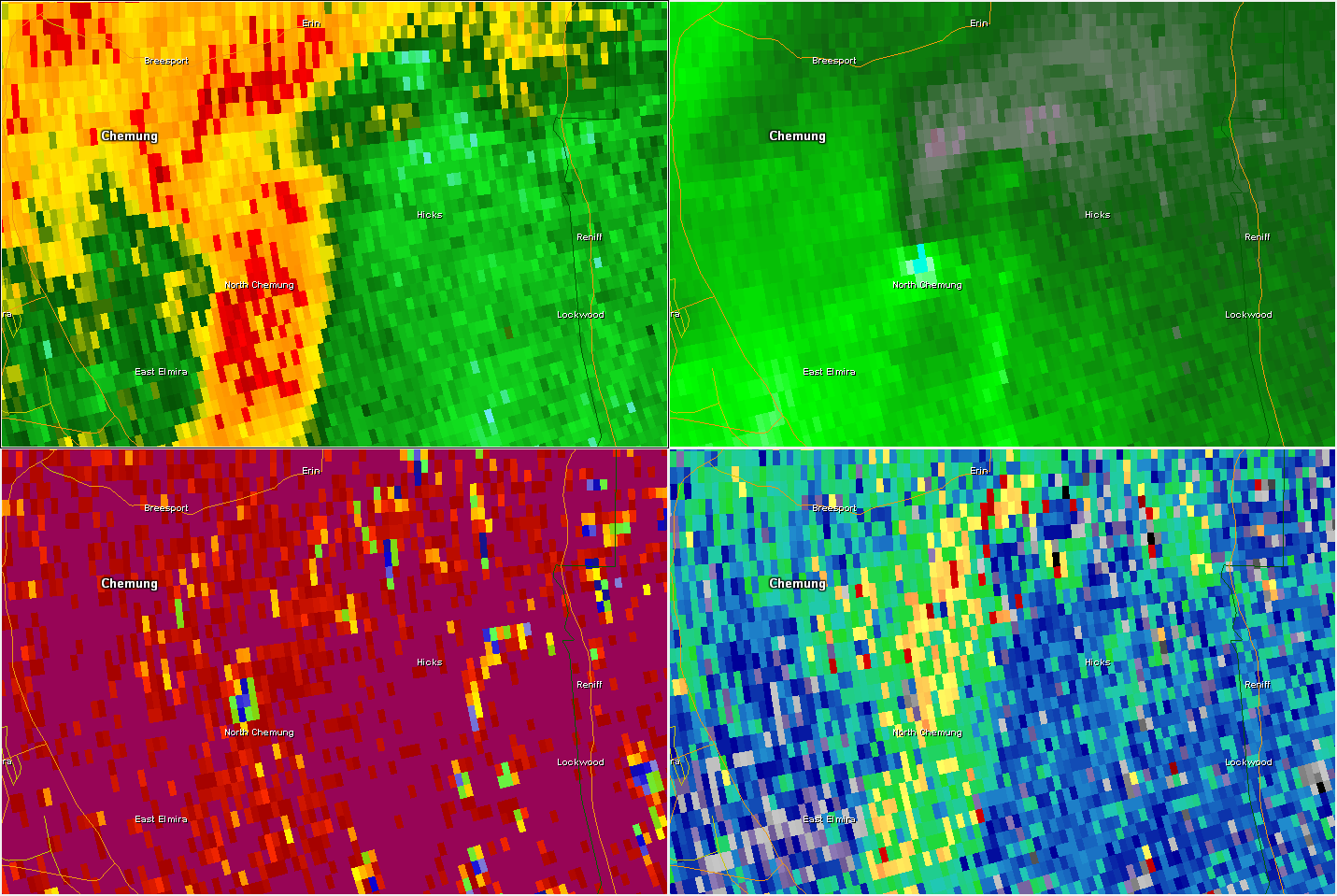
Spin-up tornado associated with a QLCS as seen from a nearby Doppler weather radar, which often goes unseen.

The concept of MRLE derives from the need of more frequent low-level scans during quasi-linear convective systems (QLCSs). During QLCSs, it is not uncommon for brief and otherwise un-noticeable mesovortices to spawn at points along the line. Due to untimely radar data and time being taken to complete the entire volume, these vortices often spawn without warning or prior notice. With MRLE, the operator has the choice between 2 and 4 low-level scans. Unlike MESO-SAILS, which scans at one angle and can only do up to 3 low-level scans per volume, MRLE scans at 4 possible angles, and can cut into a volume up to 4 times, depending on the operators choice. The angles are as follows, alongside their respective scan frequencies:

- MRLEx2 = 0.5° and 0.9° elevations
- MRLEx3 = 0.5°, 0.9° and 1.3° elevations
- MRLEx4 = 0.5°, 0.9°, 1.3° and 1.8° elevations

The operator can not use MESO-SAILS alongside MRLE simultaneously. If one is selected while the other is active, the NEXRAD algorithms will automatically set the other "off".

=== Service Life Extension Program ===
Started on March 13, 2013, the Service Life Extension Program (SLEP), is an extensive effort to keep and maintain the current NEXRAD network in working order for as long as possible. These improvements include signal processor upgrades, pedestal upgrades, transmitter upgrades, and shelter upgrades. The program is anticipated to be finished by 2022, which coincides with the beginnings of a nationwide implementation of multi-function phased array radars (see below).

== Coverage gaps ==
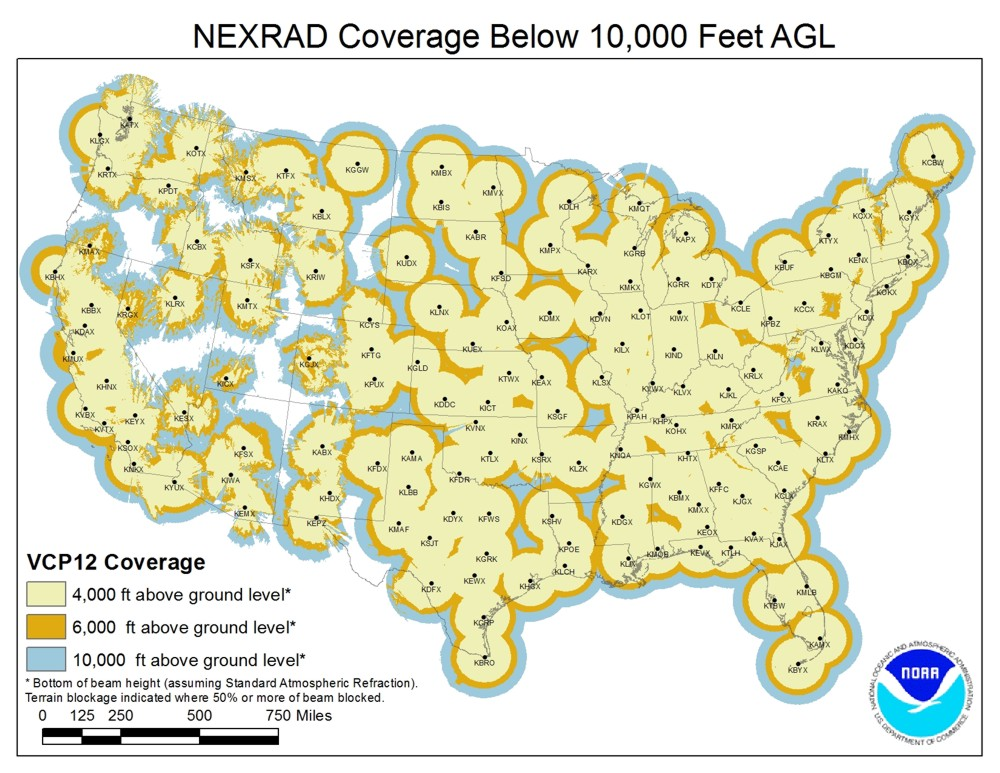
NEXRAD coverage below 10,000 feet

WSR-88D has coverage gaps below 10,000 feet (or no coverage at all) in many parts of the United States, often for terrain or budgetary reasons, or remoteness of the area. Such notable gaps include most of Alaska; several areas of Oregon, including the central and southern coast and much of the area east of the Cascade Mountains; many portions of the Rocky Mountains; Pierre, South Dakota; portions of northern Texas; large portions of the Nebraska panhandle; the Four Corners region; the area around the Northwest Angle in Minnesota; an area near the Connecticut River in Vermont; and areas near the borders of the Oklahoma and Texas Panhandles. Notably, many of these gaps lie in Tornado Alley. At least one tornado has gone undetected by WSR-88D as a result of such a coverage gap – an EF1 tornado in Lovelady, Texas in April 2014. As a result of the coverage gap, initial reports of tornadic activity were treated with skepticism by the local National Weather Service forecast office.

Coverage gaps can also be caused during radar outages, especially in areas with little to no overlapping coverage. For example, a hardware failure on July 16, 2013 resulted in an outage and coverage gap for the Albany, New York area that lasted through early August.

A coverage gap in North Carolina encouraged Senator Richard Burr to propose S. 2058, also known as the Metropolitan Weather Hazard Protection Act of 2015. The act mandates that any city with a population of 700,000 or more must have Doppler Radar coverage <6,000 feet above ground level. The bill passed the Senate, but died in a House committee.

It is not likely that additional WSR-88Ds will be deployed, as the production line was shut down in 1997, and the National Weather Service has an insufficient budget to restart production. In 2011, a known coverage gap was filled when the Langley Hill radar in southwestern Washington was installed. The radar was one of two systems donated to the NEXRAD Program from the U.S. Air Force Keesler AFB Training Center’s NEXRAD Maintenance Course assets. This radar opportunity was spearheaded by a public campaign led by Professor Cliff Mass at the University of Washington, and likely helped the NWS office in Portland, Oregon issue a timely warning for the Manzanita, OR EF-2 tornado in October, 2016.

In 2021, the National Weather Service office in Slidell, Louisiana announced that they would move the office's NEXRAD from the office building in Slidell west to Hammond at the end of 2022. Along with a lower elevation angle, the new location would enable lower level monitoring of storm activity in the Baton Rouge area, where the lowest sampling elevation would drop from 4000-6000 feet above the surface to 300-600 feet.

=== Destroyed radars ===
The NEXRAD site located in Cayey, Puerto Rico was destroyed during the passage of Hurricane Maria through the region in September 2017. In addition to a neighboring Terminal Doppler Weather Radar (TDWR) site that was rendered temporarily inoperable but ultimately survived. The Department of Defense deployed two short-range X-band radars on the island to provide radar coverage until the FAA-maintained NEXRAD site was restored. In June 2018, this NEXRAD radar site was restored to fully operational condition and was reinforced with several lightning rods and secured with a stronger fiberglass dome that included using more than 3,000 bolts.

On August 27, 2020, the NEXRAD radar site located in Lake Charles, Louisiana, was destroyed by Hurricane Laura as the eye of the Category 4 storm—which packed wind gusts recorded around 135 mph (217 km/h) in the city—passed over the site after it made landfall. NEXRAD radars based in Houston, Shreveport and Fort Polk were used to fill gaps in radar coverage within portions of Southwestern Louisiana until the Lake Charles site was rebuilt; the NWS Radar Operations Center also deployed a SMART-R vehicle on loan from the University of Oklahoma to provide supplemental radar data on Hurricane Delta in advance of its track into the region (nearly paralleling that of Hurricane Laura) in late October. Operational service to the Lake Charles NEXRAD radar site was restored in January 2021, following a four-month, $1.65-million reconstruction project that included the replacement of the radome and internal equipment and repairs to the station's radome pedestal, tower, fence and equipment shelters.

On May 24, 2023, the NEXRAD radar site located on Guam, was damaged by Typhoon Mawar as the eye of the Category 4 typhoon passed over the northern end of the island. After initially being restored back into operation, the installation suffered from ongoing issues and, as of April 24, 2024, has been reported as "unserviceable" in NOTAMs.

On August 1, 2023, the NEXRAD radar site located on Naha, was destroyed by Typhoon Khanun. The typhoon destroyed the antenna and radome, rendering the radar inoperable. On February 7, 2025, the ROC announced that the Okinawa radar was decommissioned on November 25, 2024. As noted in the notice, the Department of Defense will follow Federal property procedures to recover any salvagable parts from the radar and be used as excess material for recovery by the NEXRAD program.

== Future enhancements ==
=== Current NEXRAD system ===
The National Weather Service keeps a list of upcoming improvements to the WSR-88D system.

=== Multi-function Phased Array Radar (MPAR) ===
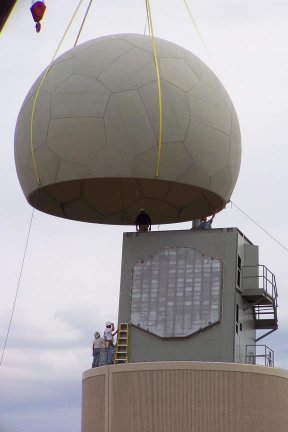
Multi-Function Phased Array Radar during installation in Norman, Oklahoma, 2003

Beyond dual-polarization, the advent of phased array radar will probably be the next major improvement in severe weather detection. Its ability to rapidly scan large areas would give an enormous advantage to radar meteorologists. Its additional ability to track both known and unknown aircraft in three dimensions would allow a phased array network to simultaneously replace the current Air Route Surveillance Radar network, saving the United States government billions of dollars in maintenance costs. The National Severe Storms Laboratory predicts that a phased array system will eventually replace the current network of WSR-88D radar transmitters.

== Applications ==
=== Usage ===
NEXRAD data is used in multiple ways. It is used by National Weather Service meteorologists and (under provisions of U.S. law) is freely available to users outside of the NWS, including researchers, media, and private citizens. The primary goal of NEXRAD data is to aid NWS meteorologists in operational forecasting. The data allows them to accurately track precipitation and anticipate its development and track. More importantly, it allows the meteorologists to track and anticipate severe weather and tornadoes. Combined with ground reports, tornado and severe thunderstorm warnings can be issued to alert the public about dangerous storms. NEXRAD data also provides information about rainfall rate and aids in hydrological forecasting. Data is provided to the public in several forms, the most basic form being graphics published to the NWS website. Data is also available in two similar, but different, raw formats. Available directly from the NWS is Level III data, consisting of reduced resolution, low-bandwidth base products as well as many derived, post-processed products; Level II data consists of only the base products, but at their original resolution. Because of the higher bandwidth costs, Level II data is not available directly from the NWS. The NWS distributes this data freely to Amazon Web Services and several top-tier universities, which in turn distribute the data to private organizations.

== Operational locations ==
List of NEXRAD sites and their coordinates
State (Abbreviation)	County or Equivalent	City or Place Name	ICAO Location Identifier	Elevation (feet)	Data start date
Puerto Rico	Cayey	San Juan	TJUA	2,958 feet (902 m)	June 27, 1997
Maine	Aroostook	Houlton	KCBW	860 feet (260 m)	January 11, 1996
Maine	Cumberland	Portland	KGYX	474 feet (144 m)	March 15, 1995
Vermont	Chittenden	Burlington	KCXX	431 feet (131 m)	January 13, 1995
Massachusetts	Bristol	Boston	KBOX	232 feet (71 m)	November 21, 1994
New York	Albany	Albany	KENX	1,935 feet (590 m)	March 16, 1995
New York	Broome	Binghamton	KBGM	1,703 feet (519 m)	November 28, 1994
New York	Erie	Buffalo	KBUF	790 feet (240 m)	February 23, 1996
New York	Lewis	Griffiss Air Force Base	KRMX	232 feet (71 m)	July 11, 1995
New York	Lewis	Montague	KTYX	504 feet (154 m)	June 10, 1998
New York	Suffolk	New York City	KOKX	199 feet (61 m)	September 13, 1993
Delaware	Sussex	Dover Air Force Base	KDOX	164 feet (50 m)	August 15, 1995
New Jersey	Ocean	Philadelphia	KDIX	230 feet (70 m)	January 25, 1995
Pennsylvania	Allegheny	Pittsburgh	KPBZ	1,266 feet (386 m)	August 4, 1994
Pennsylvania	Centre	State College	KCCX	2,486 feet (758 m)	January 13, 1995
West Virginia	Kanawha	Charleston	KRLX	1,213 feet (370 m)	August 20, 1994
Virginia	Sussex	Norfolk/Richmond	KAKQ	255 feet (78 m)	July 23, 1994
Virginia	Floyd	Roanoke	KFCX	2,965 feet (904 m)	February 13, 1995
Virginia	Loudoun	Sterling	KLWX	404 feet (123 m)	November 12, 1991
North Carolina	Carteret	Morehead City	KMHX	145 feet (44 m)	June 17, 1994
North Carolina	Johnston	Raleigh/Durham	KRAX	462 feet (141 m)	May 30, 1994
North Carolina	Brunswick	Wilmington	KLTX	145 feet (44 m)	May 11, 1995
South Carolina	Jasper	Charleston	KCLX	229 feet (70 m)	March 20, 1996
South Carolina	Lexington	Columbia	KCAE	345 feet (105 m)	June 27, 1994
South Carolina	Spartanburg	Greer	KGSP	1,069 feet (326 m)	April 19, 1995
Georgia	Fayette	Atlanta	KFFC	972 feet (296 m)	November 9, 1994
Georgia	Lanier	Moody Air Force Base	KVAX	330 feet (100 m)	October 17, 1996
Georgia	Twiggs	Robins Air Force Base	KJGX	618 feet (188 m)	August 16, 1994
Florida	Walton	Eglin Air Force Base	KEVX	221 feet (67 m)	August 15, 1994
Florida	Duval	Jacksonville	KJAX	160 feet (49 m)	February 10, 1995
Florida	Monroe	Key West	KBYX	89 feet (27 m)	July 20, 1996
Florida	Brevard	Melbourne	KMLB	149 feet (45 m)	October 16, 1991
Florida	Miami-Dade	Miami	KAMX	111 feet (34 m)	August 21, 1993
Florida	Leon	Tallahassee	KTLH	177 feet (54 m)	June 16, 1995
Florida	Hillsborough	Tampa	KTBW	122 feet (37 m)	February 27, 1995
Alabama	Shelby	Birmingham	KBMX	759 feet (231 m)	May 9, 1994
Alabama	Dale	Fort Rucker	KEOX	537 feet (164 m)	March 26, 1996
Alabama	Jackson	Huntsville	KHTX	1,859 feet (567 m)	July 5, 1997
Alabama	Macon	Maxwell Air Force Base	KMXX	560 feet (170 m)	October 27, 1995
Alabama	Mobile	Mobile	KMOB	289 feet (88 m)	January 12, 1995
Mississippi	Hinds	Jackson	KJAN	361 feet (110 m)	June 27, 1994
Mississippi	Rankin	Jackson/Brandon	KDGX	609 feet (186 m)	February 11, 2003
Mississippi	Monroe	Columbus Air Force Base	KGWX	609 feet (186 m)	June 2, 1995
Tennessee	Hamblen	Morristown	KMRX	1,434 feet (437 m)	November 29, 1994
Tennessee	Shelby	Memphis	KNQA	435 feet (133 m)	April 11, 1994
Tennessee	Wilson	Nashville	KOHX	676 feet (206 m)	October 13, 1994
Kentucky	Todd	Fort Campbell	KHPX	613 feet (187 m)	September 5, 1995
Kentucky	Breathitt	Jackson	KJKL	1,461 feet (445 m)	August 14, 1996
Kentucky	Hardin	Louisville	KLVX	833 feet (254 m)	May 6, 1994
Kentucky	McCracken	Paducah	KPAH	506 feet (154 m)	June 2, 1995
Ohio	Clinton	Wilmington	KILN	1,170 feet (360 m)	May 17, 1995
Ohio	Cuyahoga	Cleveland	KCLE	860 feet (260 m)	January 15, 1995
Michigan	Oakland	Detroit/Pontiac	KDTX	1,216 feet (371 m)	February 20, 1995
Michigan	Otsego	Gaylord	KAPX	1,561 feet (476 m)	May 23, 1996
Michigan	Kent	Grand Rapids	KGRR	875 feet (267 m)	September 21, 1995
Michigan	Marquette	Marquette	KMQT	1,525 feet (465 m)	October 16, 1995
Indiana	Gibson	Evansville	KVWX	625 feet (191 m)	January 29, 2003
Indiana	Marion	Indianapolis	KIND	887 feet (270 m)	August 5, 1994
Indiana	Kosciusko	Fort Wayne	KIWX	1,056 feet (322 m)	March 6, 1994
Illinois	Will	Chicago	KLOT	760 feet (230 m)	August 16, 1993
Illinois	Logan	Lincoln	KILX	731 feet (223 m)	August 9, 1995
Wisconsin	Brown	Green Bay	KGRB	823 feet (251 m)	June 13, 1995
Wisconsin	La Crosse	La Crosse	KARX	1,357 feet (414 m)	July 8, 1996
Wisconsin	Jefferson	Milwaukee	KMKX	1,023 feet (312 m)	April 27, 1995
Minnesota	Saint Louis	Duluth	KDLH	1,542 feet (470 m)	October 5, 1995
Minnesota	Carver	Minneapolis	KMPX	1,101 feet (336 m)	May 30, 1995
Iowa	Scott	Davenport	KDVN	851 feet (259 m)	January 9, 1995
Iowa	Polk	Des Moines	KDMX	1,095 feet (334 m)	March 13, 1995
Missouri	Cass	Kansas City	KEAX	1,092 feet (333 m)	April 14, 1994
Missouri	Greene	Springfield	KSGF	1,375 feet (419 m)	April 24, 1995
Missouri	Saint Charles	Saint Louis	KSGF	722 feet (220 m)	August 4, 1992
Arkansas	Sebastian	Fort Smith	KSRX	737 feet (225 m)	February 10, 1997
Arkansas	Pulaski	Little Rock	KLZK	649 feet (198 m)	April 12, 1994
Louisiana	Vernon	Fort Polk	KPOE	473 feet (144 m)	June 28, 1995
Louisiana	Tangipahoa	Hammond	KHDC	144 feet (44 m)	March 23, 2024
Louisiana	Calcasieu	Lake Charles	KLCH	137 feet (42 m)	April 23, 1995
Louisiana	Caddo	Shreveport	KSHV	387 feet (118 m)	August 28, 1995
Texas	Potter	Amarillo	KAMA	3,703 feet (1,129 m)	January 14, 1994
Texas	Comal	Austin/San Antonio	KEWX	767 feet (234 m)	March 20, 1995
Texas	Cameron	Brownsville	KBRO	88 feet (27 m)	May 23, 1995
Texas	Nueces	Corpus Christi	KCRP	142 feet (43 m)	June 30, 1996
Texas	Tarrant	Dallas/Fort Worth	KFWS	777 feet (237 m)	March 23, 1994
Texas	Shackelford	Dyess Air Force Base	KDYX	1,582 feet (482 m)	May 5, 1995
New Mexico	Doña Ana	El Paso, Texas	KEPZ	4,218 feet (1,286 m)	May 15, 1996
Texas	Williamson	Fort Hood	KGRK	603 feet (184 m)	April 21, 1995
Texas	Galveston	Houston	KHGX	115 feet (35 m)	August 25, 1992
Texas	Kinney	Laughlin Air Force Base	KDFX	1,196 feet (365 m)	January 26, 1996
Texas	Lubbock	Lubbock	KLBB	3,378 feet (1,030 m)	April 1, 1994
Texas	Midland	Midland/Odessa	KMAF	2,962 feet (903 m)	June 8, 1995
Texas	Tom Green	San Angelo	KSJT	2,004 feet (611 m)	April 7, 1996
Oklahoma	Tillman	Frederick Regional Airport	KFDR	1,258 feet (383 m)	February 15, 1992
Oklahoma	Cleveland	Oklahoma City	KTLX	1,278 feet (390 m)	June 5, 1991
Oklahoma	Cleveland	Norman (National Severe Storms Laboratory)	KOUN	1,284 feet (391 m)	May 9, 2010
Oklahoma	Cleveland	Norman (Radar Operations Center)	KCRI	1,315 feet (401 m)	October 31, 2014
Oklahoma	Rogers	Inola	KINX	749 feet (228 m)	April 18, 1994
Oklahoma	Alfalfa	Vance Air Force Base	KVNX	1,258 feet (383 m)	November 22, 1994
Kansas	Ford	Dodge City	KDDC	2,671 feet (814 m)	September 29, 1992
Kansas	Sherman	Goodland	KGLD	3,716 feet (1,133 m)	December 13, 1992
Kansas	Wabaunsee	Topeka	KTWX	1,415 feet (431 m)	October 25, 1993
Kansas	Sedgwick	Wichita	KICT	1,400 feet (430 m)	November 10, 1992
Nebraska	Webster	Hastings	KUEX	2,057 feet (627 m)	October 27, 1994
Nebraska	Thomas	North Platte	KLNX	3,113 feet (949 m)	May 3, 1996
Nebraska	Douglas	Omaha	KOAX	1,262 feet (385 m)	April 18, 1995
South Dakota	Brown	Aberdeen	KABR	1,383 feet (422 m)	December 1, 1994
South Dakota	Pennington	Rapid City	KUDX	3,195 feet (974 m)	January 20, 1996
South Dakota	Minnehaha	Sioux Falls	KFSD	1,495 feet (456 m)	December 7, 1993
North Dakota	Burleigh	Bismarck	KBIS	1,755 feet (535 m)	October 18, 1994
North Dakota	Traill	Grand Forks	KMVX	1,083 feet (330 m)	December 16, 1995
North Dakota	McHenry	Minot Air Force Base	KMBX	1,590 feet (480 m)	July 24, 1995
Montana	Yellowstone	Billings	KBLX	3,703 feet (1,129 m)	December 6, 1995
Montana	Valley	Glasgow	KGGW	2,384 feet (727 m)	February 1, 1996
Montana	Cascade	Great Falls	KTFX	3,805 feet (1,160 m)	January 12, 1995
Montana	Missoula	Missoula	KMSX	7,978 feet (2,432 m)	January 13, 1995
Wyoming	Laramie	Cheyenne	KCYS	6,193 feet (1,888 m)	June 7, 1994
Wyoming	Fremont	Riverton	KRIW	5,633 feet (1,717 m)	October 2, 1995
Colorado	Adams County	Denver	KFTG	5,611 feet (1,710 m)	June 19, 1993
Colorado	Mesa	Grand Junction	KGJX	10,101 feet (3,079 m)	February 1, 1996
Colorado	Pueblo	Pueblo	KPUX	5,363 feet (1,635 m)	June 13, 1995
New Mexico	Bernalillo	Albuquerque	KABX	5,951 feet (1,814 m)	September 14, 1994
New Mexico	Curry	Cannon Air Force Base	KFDX	4,698 feet (1,432 m)	June 28, 1995
New Mexico	Otero	Holloman Air Force Base	KHDX	4,270 feet (1,300 m)	August 24, 1995
Arizona	Coconino	Flagstaff	KFSX	7,514 feet (2,290 m)	January 7, 1996
Arizona	Maricopa	Phoenix	KIWA	1,426 feet (435 m)	June 30, 1993
Arizona	Pima	Tucson	KEMX	5,319 feet (1,621 m)	October 3, 1995
Arizona	Yuma	Yuma	KYUX	239 feet (73 m)	July 26, 1996
Utah	Iron	Cedar City	KICX	10,757 feet (3,279 m)	September 16, 1996
Utah	Box Elder	Salt Lake City	KMTX	6,594 feet (2,010 m)	February 22, 1995
Idaho	Ada	Boise	KCBX	3,172 feet (967 m)	January 12, 1994
Idaho	Bingham	Pocatello	KSFX	4,539 feet (1,383 m)	September 27, 1995
Nevada	Lander	Elko	KLRX	6,895 feet (2,102 m)	February 4, 1996
Nevada	Clark	Las Vegas	KESX	4,948 feet (1,508 m)	June 14, 1995
Nevada	Washoe	Reno	KRGX	8,396 feet (2,559 m)	February 24, 1995
California	Butte	Beale Air Force Base	KBBX	221 feet (67 m)	October 22, 1996
California	San Bernardino	Edwards Air Force Base	KEYX	2,873 feet (876 m)	August 21, 1995
California	Humboldt	Eureka	KBHX	2,516 feet (767 m)	May 8, 1995
California	Ventura	Los Angeles	KVTX	2,807 feet (856 m)	August 16, 1994
California	Yolo County	Sacramento	KDAX	144 feet (44 m)	January 26, 1994
California	San Diego	San Diego	KNKX	1,052 feet (321 m)	April 30, 1996
California	Santa Clara	San Francisco	KMUX	3,550 feet (1,080 m)	March 29, 1994
California	Kings	San Joaquin Valley	KHNX	340 feet (100 m)	March 21, 1995
California	Orange	Santa Ana Mountains	KSOX	3,106 feet (947 m)	December 6, 1996
California	Santa Barbara	Vandenberg Air Force Base	KVBX	1,354 feet (413 m)	November 21, 1995
Hawaii	Kauaʻi	South Kauai	PHKI	340 feet (100 m)	January 5, 1996
Hawaii	Hawaiʻi	Kamuela	PHKM	3,966 feet (1,209 m)	July 23, 1998
Hawaii	Maui	Molokaʻi	PHMO	1,444 feet (440 m)	April 5, 1996
Hawaii	Hawaiʻi	South Shore	PHWA	1,461 feet (445 m)	June 19, 1998
Oregon	Jackson	Medford	KMAX	7,561 feet (2,305 m)	January 18, 1996
Oregon	Umatilla	Pendleton	KPDT	1,580 feet (480 m)	April 20, 1996
Oregon	Washington	Portland	KRTX	1,728 feet (527 m)	March 13, 1995
Washington	Grays Harbor	Langley Hill	KLGX	366 feet (112 m)	August 17, 2011
Washington	Island	Seattle	KATX	642 feet (196 m)	October 27, 1994
Washington	Spokane	Spokane	KOTX	2,449 feet (746 m)	April 10, 1996
Alaska	Bethel	Bethel	PABC	193 feet (59 m)	May 1, 2001
Alaska	Fairbanks North Star	Fairbanks	PAPD	193 feet (59 m)	December 17, 1996
Alaska	Kenai Peninsula	Anchorage	PAHG	356 feet (109 m)	September 16, 1996
Alaska	Bristol Bay	King Salmon	PAKC	144 feet (44 m)	August 26, 1996
Alaska	Chugach	Middleton Island	PAIH	132 feet (40 m)	March 8, 1997
Alaska	Nome	Nome	PAEC	90 feet (27 m)	March 8, 1997
Alaska	Sitka	Sitka	PACG	272 feet (83 m)	May 14, 1997
Guam	Mangilao	Andersen Air Force Base	PGUA	386 feet (118 m)	May 22, 1995
North Jeolla (South Korea)		Kunsan Air Base	RKJK	192 feet (59 m)	June 18, 1997
Gyeonggi (South Korea)		Camp Humphreys	RKSG	1,521 feet (464 m)	March 11, 1996

== See also ==
- Canadian weather radar network
- Australian Weather Radars
- Low level windshear alert system (LLWAS)
- Terminal Doppler Weather Radar (TDWR)
- High Resolution Rapid Refresh (HRRR)
- Geostationary Operational Environmental Satellite
