= MythBusters (2010 season) =

- No. of episodes: 24 (includes 3 specials)

Release
- Original network: Discovery Channel
- Original release: January 4 – December 22, 2010

Season chronology
- ← Previous; 2009 season Next → 2011 season

The cast of the television series MythBusters perform experiments to verify or debunk urban legends, old wives' tales, and the like. This is a list of the various myths tested on the show as well as the results of the experiments (the myth is busted, plausible, or confirmed).

== Episode overview ==
No. overall	No. in season	Title	Original release date	Overall episode No.
137	1	"Boomerang Bullet"	January 4, 2010	151
Myths tested: Can you accidentally kill yourself with a bullet that ricochets off three walls? Could a medieval army have used trees to catapult dead bodies over a castle wall?
138	2	"Soda Cup Killer"	March 24, 2010	152
Myths tested: If a cup filled with soda was tossed out the window of a car, would it penetrate the windshield of a passing car, killing the driver? Can you really hang from the edge of a building like in the movies? Note: This is Jessi Combs's final appearance as a member of the Build Team.
139	3	"Dive to Survive"	March 31, 2010	153
Myths tested: Can you escape an explosive shockwave by diving in water? Can you bulletproof a car using nothing but phone books? Note: Kari Byron returns from maternity leave.
140	4	"Spy Car Escape"	April 7, 2010	154
Myths tested: Can an object fired backward from a vehicle moving forward simply fall to the ground? Do the movie spy car tricks to escape a chasing car work?
141	5	"Bottle Bash"	April 14, 2010	155
Myths tested: Is it worse to have an empty beer bottle smashed over your head than a full one? Could ancient armies have used animal hides to build their cannons?
142	6	"No Pain, No Gain"	April 28, 2010	156
Myths tested: Are some types of people more tolerant to pain? Can a BBQ propane tank heat up enough in a fire to launch through a garage roof like a rocket?
143	7	"Mythssion Control"	May 5, 2010	157
Myths tested: Can someone really be knocked out of their socks? (Revisit of: Knock Your Socks Off); Is the force exerted between two cars crashing into each other at 50 mph the same as a single car hitting a wall at 50 mph?
144	8	"Duct Tape Hour 2"	May 12, 2010	158
Myths tested: Can duct tape be used to build a bridge? Can duct tape be used to fix a car? Can duct tape be used to hold a car in place? Can duct tape be used to stop a car going 60 miles per hour? Note: This is a special episode.
145	9	"Waterslide Wipeout"	May 19, 2010	159
Myths tested: Can a person be launched 115 feet into a kiddie pool from a giant waterslide? Can a mail delivery truck taking only right turns save gas?
146	10	"Fireball Stun Gun"	June 2, 2010	160
Myths tested: Does pepper spray, a flannel shirt, and a stun gun cause massive fireball? Can fireworks really launch a person over a lake?
147	11	"Flu Fiction"	June 9, 2010	161
Myths tested: Can a sneeze leave a person's nose at around 100 mph? Can sneeze droplets travel up to 30 ft? Can nasal secretions contaminate a room quickly? Can you be decapitated by a tornado?
SP14	Special–1	"Top 25 Moments"	June 16, 2010	162
The top 25 moments of MythBusters are counted down by the cast with additional comments. Note: This is a special double-length clip-show episode.
148	12	"Hair of the Dog"	October 6, 2010	163
Myths tested: Is there any way to prevent a bloodhound from tracking one's scent? (Revisit of: Foil the Bloodhound); Is it possible to fool a dog trained to sniff out contraband?
149	13	"Storm Chasing Myths"	October 13, 2010	164
Myths tested: Are the Storm Chasers' vehicles fit to withstand force 5 tornado speeds? Is it possible to build a personal tornado protection device? Note: This is a special episode. It is a crossover episode with Storm Chasers and is dedicated to honorary MythBuster Sanjay Singh.
150	14	"Cold Feet"	October 20, 2010	165
Myths tested: When you get "cold feet", do your feet actually get colder? When the poop hits the fan, does everyone get covered in the ensuing chaos?
151	15	"Tablecloth Chaos"	October 27, 2010	166
Myths tested: Can a motorcycle pull a tablecloth out from under a setting for a banquet? Do humans really use only 10% of their brain?
152	16	"Arrow Machine Gun"	November 3, 2010 (US); October 25, 2010 (UK)	167
Myths tested: Did the Greeks create an arrow machine gun that offered the speed, distance, and precision that modern machine guns do? Is driving while tired worse than driving while tipsy?
153	17	"Mini Myth Madness"	November 10, 2010	168
Myths tested: Can a scuba diver wear a tuxedo underneath his drysuit, go underwater, resurface, strip off his scuba gear, and be able to present the tuxedo perfectly? Can a car's tire pressure affect its fuel efficiency? Can a laptop stop a bullet from point-blank range? Can a hair weave stop a .40 caliber bullet? Can a fridge door stop a round of 9mm bullets? Out of using your elbow, using your hand, and using a handkerchief to cover your mouth when you sneeze, which is the best way to limit the spread of germs? Is it easy to take candy from a baby? Can a bottle of beer, when given a sudden shock, turn from a liquid and freeze into a solid?
154	18	"Reverse Engineering"	November 17, 2010 (US); November 8, 2010 (UK)	169
Myths tested: Does a certain 1970s sports car become more aerodynamic if the body is turned backwards? Can a surfboard be launched through the windscreen of a car and be lethal, like in the movie Lethal Weapon 2?
155	19	"Inverted Underwater Car"	November 24, 2010	170
Myths tested: Is it more difficult to escape from a sinking car that flips upside down than from one that remains right-side up? Can a carton of milk keep a pistol's muzzle flash from igniting a room full of flammable gas?
156	20	"Bug Special"	December 1, 2010	171
Myths tested: Can honey bees lift a laptop? Can hitting a bug at high speeds on a motorcycle be fatal? Can hanging a bag of water repel flies?
157	21	"President's Challenge"	December 8, 2010	172
Myths tested: Can mirrors be used to make a death ray? (Revisit of: Ancient Death Ray); Is it possible to make a moving SUV flip end-over-end by punching down on the hood, like in the film Hellboy? Note: President Obama made a special appearance challenging Adam and Jamie to revisit the "Ancient Death Ray" myth.
158	22	"Green Hornet Special"	December 15, 2010	173
Myths tested: Can a buried car use onboard explosives to blast a bulldozer out of the way without injuring the passengers? If a bullet-riddled car gets stuck in a rising elevator, will the ceiling cut it in half, and can the front end be driven away? Note: Seth Rogen makes a special appearance, challenging the cast to replicate two scenes from his film The Green Hornet.
159	23	"Operation Valkyrie"	December 22, 2010	174
Myths tested: Did Adolf Hitler survive Operation Valkyrie only because he was in a conference room instead of an underground bunker? Can you literally knock some sense into a person by slapping them?

== Episode 137 – "Boomerang Bullet" ==
- Original air date: January 4, 2010

Adam and Jamie probe a potentially fatal three-way ricochet, while the Build Team tries to re-create medieval germ warfare by turning trees into catapults.

=== 360° Ricochet ===
Myth statement	Status	Notes
A person firing a gun can accidentally kill himself if his bullet ricochets off three surfaces and returns to him.	Busted	Adam and Jamie set up three steel plates at 90-degree angles, along with a .45 caliber pistol and a cardboard cutout of Jamie behind it. In three trials with different ammunition types—unjacketed lead, full metal jacket, and total metal jacket—the bullets fragmented after striking the first plate. A fourth trial, using a hardened steel ball bearing in a bullet casing, led to three ricochets and a hit on the shooter; however, the projectile struck at a less-than-lethal speed. Other materials were investigated for use as targets, starting with measurements of ricochet angles and speeds from only one plate. Cinderblock pavers were chosen over lead due to the latter's tendency to make bullets tumble and lose too much speed. When Adam and Jamie set up three pavers and fired a TMJ round, they observed three ricochets and a less-than-lethal hit on the Jamie cutout. Finally, Adam and Jamie bent a piece of plumbing pipe into a curve to serve as a bullet guide, firing into one end toward a block of ballistic gelatin at the other. A 46-inch (117 cm) diameter curve, forming nearly a full circle, resulted in lethal speed and penetration on the target (with an Adam cutout in front of it). Adam and Jamie declared the myth busted, owing to the slow speed of the bullet after three ricochets.

=== Conifer Catapult ===
Myth statement	Status	Notes
A medieval army laying siege to a castle could have used nearby coniferous trees as an improvised catapult to hurl diseased corpses over the wall.	Busted	The Build Team began by visiting a tree plantation to determine the amount of bending force a typical conifer could withstand without breaking. Their first test, on a Gray Pine, gave a result of 2,000 pounds-force (8,900 N); they loaded Buster into a second such tree and applied the same force, but he only fell to the ground when they released it. Returning to the workshop, the Build Team set up some small-scale tests with saplings of three different types—Douglas-fir, redwood, and Alaskan cedar—and a miniature Buster figure. Preliminary trials showed that the fir could give the longest range for the same bending angle, so the team trimmed off the limbs and attached a tether to keep the payload in place until the right moment. With these modifications, the sapling flung "Mini McBuster" all the way to the other end of the shop. At the plantation, the team found a full-size Douglas-fir and set it up in the same way, aiming at a bouncy castle 100 feet (30 m) away with a 40-foot (12 m) balloon "wall". With 2,400 pounds-force (11,000 N) of bending force on the trunk, Buster flew almost all the way to the castle, but he hit the ground just short of it. Because they were unable to hit their target even with the benefit of modern machinery and cutting off all the limbs, the team declared the myth busted. They also noted that the troops setting up the catapult would have been picked off long before the plan reached its final phase.

== Episode 138 – "Soda Cup Killer" ==
- Original air date: March 24, 2010

This episode was Jessi Combs's final appearance as a member of the Build Team.

=== Cup vs Car ===
Myth statement	Status	Notes
A foam cup filled with soda, tossed from a car moving at highway speed, is capable of piercing another car's windshield and killing the driver.	Partly busted	Adam and Jamie first fired several different mixes of soda and ice out of an air cannon to measure which was capable of delivering the most force. They found that slush was the most effective mix. They then built a test rig with a windshield and Buster that simulated an oncoming vehicle. In a test run at 40 miles per hour (64 km/h), the cup was able to crack the windshield. At the full 60 mph (97 km/h), the cup pierced the windshield, but it did not retain enough force to be lethal to Buster. Adam and Jamie then decided to switch to using soda cans. While they worked better at piercing the windshield, Adam was unable to hit the windshield accurately enough to hit Buster. Adam and Jamie resorted to using a shoulder mounted air cannon Jamie built, but they still could not hit the windshield accurately enough. With one windshield left, the MythBusters instead fired at the windshield at point-blank range, "killing" Buster. However, since the cup lacked the power to harm Buster, the myth was declared busted. The MythBusters did point out that the situation was dangerous; the driver on the receiving end would likely be startled by the cup and would have trouble seeing out of the cracked windshield. That, in addition to being covered in the sticky drink and the splinters of glass from the broken window, would likely result in a very serious accident (and possibly death).

=== Fall Guys ===
Myth statement	Status	Notes
A person can hang off the edge of a building or cliff indefinitely.	Busted	The Build Team first tried to hang off the edge of a building (37.677157°N 121.857899°W) with three inches of space to hold on to. All three members could hold on for only roughly one minute (Tory also badly hurt his knee on a window ledge in the process). They then reduced the grip space to one inch; now Jessi could hold on for only thirty seconds, while Grant could not get a grip at all and instantly fell when hanging from half an inch. Aaron, an expert, showed that he could hold on to an inch of space for roughly forty seconds and half an inch of space for fourteen seconds. However, nobody could hold on to the edge indefinitely. The Build Team concluded that the only way one could be saved in this situation is if help arrived very quickly.
A person can hang off the landing skid of a moving helicopter and successfully climb into the helicopter.	Confirmed	Because hanging off an actual helicopter was deemed too dangerous, the Build Team decided to simulate the experiment. They first tested the downward force generated by a helicopter to see whether it would affect a person's ability to hang off the skid, but they found that it would exert only at most 130 grams-force (1.3 N; 0.29 lbf), which was negligible. For the experiment, they built a fake helicopter and hung it over a swimming pool for safety reasons. To simulate movement, they set up a large fan that could create winds of up to 95 mph (153 km/h). Jessi, Tory, and Grant all took turns hanging off the skid and succeeded in climbing into the helicopter. Though the experiment was a success, the Build Team was quick to point out that it was much harder than the movies would make it seem.

== Episode 139 – "Dive to Survive" ==
- Original air date: March 31, 2010

Kari Byron returns to the series as of this episode.

=== Dive to Survive ===
Myth statement	Status	Notes
Diving underwater can protect you from an explosion.	Plausible	During their small-scale tests using rupture discs, the MythBusters discovered that water can actually diminish the force of a shock wave caused by an explosion, giving credence to the myth. For their full-scale test, the MythBusters hung rupture discs 5 ft (1.5 m) above water, 5 feet (1.5 m) below water, and 10 ft (3.0 m) below water at 5-foot, 10-foot (3.0 m), 20-foot (6.1 m), and 50-foot (15 m) intervals away from the explosive. The MythBusters also detonated 50 pounds (23 kg) of three different types of explosives above the water: gasoline, ammonium nitrate, and dynamite. While the gasoline could rupture only the closest above-water disc, the ammonium nitrate ruptured every single disc and the dynamite ruptured all the discs except for the underwater discs located 50 feet (15 m) away. With these differing results, the MythBusters declared that the myth was possible, depending on the explosive.

=== Phonebook Freedom ===
Myth statement	Status	Notes
Filling the cavities of a car with phonebooks will make the car bulletproof for non-armor-piercing rounds.	Busted	The Build Team filled several car doors with phonebooks and fired various firearms at it. The phonebooks were able to stop 9mm, .357 magnum, and .45 caliber rounds. However, the more powerful deer slug shotgun rounds and the M14 rifle were able to pierce the door and the phonebooks easily. Since the phonebooks could not stop all of the bullets, the myth was declared busted. However, the Build Team continued the experiment to see how many phonebooks behind the door would be needed to stop a deer slug and rifle round and found that only two phonebooks were needed.
A car completely covered in phonebooks will be bulletproof.	Busted	The Build Team calculated how many phonebooks would be needed to completely bulletproof the car, which would be around 900. However, the number needed weighed significantly more than the car could carry, so the Build Team was forced to cut back the number of phonebooks they could use down to 400. They then installed a remote control system in the car and covered it with as many phonebooks as they could, and placed inflatable dummies inside to simulate people. They then drove the car around as they fired M14 and deer slug rounds at it. All of the dummies inside the car survived. In their second test, the Build Team fired at the car with M16s and UMP40s, but all of the dummies survived. For the third test, the Build Team fired various high-powered sniper rifles at the car. Kari managed to disable the car with a .50 caliber round, and the combined sniper fire managed to kill everybody in the car. Though the car was highly resistant to bullets, the fact that they could still penetrate the car and harm the people inside led the Build Team to declare the myth busted.

== Episode 140 – "Spy Car Escape" ==
- Original air date: April 7, 2010

=== Spy Car Escape ===
These myths are based on countless car chase scenes from spy movies. The MythBusters try to test whether a pursuing car can be stopped or eluded using...

Myth statement	Status	Notes
...road spikes or tacks.	Busted	While the road spikes managed to puncture the pursuit car's tires, they did not instantly deflate and the pursuit car managed to catch Adam. The reason the spikes failed was attributed to the fact that the spikes stuck in the tires, partially plugging up the holes and causing the tires to deflate more slowly. In episode 234 of the 2015 season, this myth was revisited with hollow road spikes, which performed so well that the myth was declared confirmed.
...a smokescreen.	Confirmed	During the first run, Jamie attached several smoke grenades to the rear of his car to create a makeshift smokescreen. While the test was initially successful, the smokescreen quickly backfired when the smoke was sucked into Jamie's car as well, blinding and choking him and forcing him to stop the chase. They modified the rig to keep the smoke grenades outside the car, and Adam drove while wearing an oxygen mask. The second test was more successful, with Adam being able to use the smokescreen to elude the pursuit car.
...an oil slick.	Plausible	The pursuit car was slowed down significantly by the oil slick, allowing Jamie to elude it. However, the pursuit car did not instantly spin out as is popularly shown in movies.

The MythBusters then built their own car-stopping devices. They then attempted to see if a pursuer could be stopped with...

Myth statement	Status	Notes
...Adam's parachute rig.	Fail	As part of the MythBusters' challenge, Adam designed a rig that would deploy a parachute and release it in hopes of blinding the pursuit car. While the parachute successfully deployed, the pursuit car was able to avoid it and chase down Adam. Both Adam and Jamie agreed that it might have worked but that the challenge required a more reliable method.
...Jamie's specialized car-stopping devices.	Partly successful	As part of the MythBusters' challenge, Jamie designed specialized car-stoppers meant to get caught in the pursuit car's undercarriage and slow it down. While they deployed successfully, the pursuit car managed to stay on Jamie's tail despite taking serious damage from the car-stoppers. Adam and Jamie pointed out that if the chase had gone on for much longer, the pursuit car would not have been able to keep up.

=== Vector Vengeance ===
Myth statement	Status	Notes
Throwing an object backward off a moving vehicle at the same speed as the vehicle is traveling forward will cause the object to drop straight to the ground.	Confirmed	For their first test, the Build Team used a treadmill running at 10 mph (16 km/h) to launch a weight off the back of a truck, and saw that the weight was propelled 6 ft (2 m) away. Next, the Build Team repeated the experiment but had the truck driving at 10 mph, and the weight seemed to drop straight down. They then repeated the experiment at 60 mph (97 km/h) using an air cannon to fire a soccer ball. However, they could not get the ball to drop straight down and decided to change their method of firing the ball. They tested a soccer ball-pitching machine and Grant's ball-kicking robot against the air cannon. In the end, they decided to stay with the air cannon after finding out it performed the most consistently among all three machines. The Build Team attempted the experiment again, and after a number of tries, they finally managed to get the ball to drop straight down.

== Episode 141 – "Bottle Bash" ==
- Original air date: April 14, 2010

=== Bottle Bash ===
Myth statement	Status	Notes
When somebody bashes somebody else in the head with a beer bottle, an empty beer bottle will cause more damage than a full one.	Busted	The MythBusters first started by striking a fake human head with both full and empty bottles. The initial results showed that the full bottle struck with an average G-force of 28.1, while the empty bottle struck at an average of 22.7 Gs. However, the MythBusters noted that the G-forces varied widely depending on how hard the head was struck. To get more consistent results, Adam built a machine to simulate a swinging arm. In their second test, the MythBusters used the robot arm to strike a container with gelatin representing the human brain. Analyzing the results, they found that the full bottle still delivered more force to the brain than the empty bottle, making an injury like a concussion more likely. However, the MythBusters decided to factor in other injuries such as skull fractures and lacerations. They built a container to more closely simulate a human skull. The full bottles were able to smash the skull, while the empty bottle could not even crack it. They then used artificial skin and blood to test for lacerations. However, the full and empty bottles caused the same number of lacerations. The full bottle was clearly more capable of causing damage than the empty bottle.

=== Leather Cannon ===
Myth statement	Status	Notes
A fully functional cannon can be built completely out of leather.	Busted	For comparison, the Build Team fired a Civil War Parrott gun of similar size to the cannons described in the myth to measure its muzzle velocity, which was 389 mph (626 km/h). Because there are two separate versions of the myth, originating from Sweden and Ireland, the Build Team decided to test both designs. The Swedish cannon consisted of a copper core wrapped in leather and iron bands, while the Irish cannon was built completely out of leather. The Swedish cannon managed to fire its cannonball at a speed of 450 mph (720 km/h), but it blew out its breech in the process. The Irish cannon failed spectacularly, with the breech blowing out, the cannonball moving only two feet, and the barrel completely unravelling, making a second shot impossible. The team then built a third leather cannon and reinforced it with significantly more leather. They also lubricated the barrel to make it easier for the cannonball to fire. The cannon managed to fire successfully, but the cannonball could achieve a speed of only 52 mph (84 km/h). While the cannon was still structurally intact, the barrel was too damaged for a second shot.

== Episode 142 – "No Pain, No Gain" ==
- Original air date: April 28, 2010

=== No Pain, No Gain ===
Adam and Jamie subjected themselves to four painful stimuli—heat and electric current for Jamie, capsaicin (injected under the skin) and cold for Adam—and chose to use cold for their investigations. They then built a chair for test subjects to sit in, with an ice bath at 1 °C (34 °F) into which they would immerse one hand for as long as they could endure it, and imposed a 3-minute maximum. The following four myths were tested.

Myth statement	Status	Notes
Women have a higher pain tolerance than men.	Confirmed	Twenty-five members of each gender took part. The women lasted an average of 100.4 seconds in the ice, while the average for the men was 84.3 seconds.
Women who have undergone childbirth without using pain medication have a higher pain tolerance than women who have not.	Confirmed	In the SBS version of the episode, it was shown that the women who had given birth without pain medication lasted an average of 124 seconds in the above test, while the rest lasted an average of 73.8 seconds. Notably, the latter average was lower than that for the men.
Natural redheads have a lower pain tolerance than people of other hair colors.	Busted	Two dozen people of each group (redheads and non-redheads) took part. The average time for the redheads was 132.2 seconds, while that for the non-redheads was 79.1 seconds.
Cursing aloud will allow a person to tolerate more pain than using mild language.	Confirmed	Adam, Jamie, Grant, Tory, and Kari subjected themselves to the ice bath while saying a list of innocuous words to cope with the pain. Jamie and Tory had to disqualify themselves because they lasted the full 3 minutes; Tory also began cursing during this attempt. They were replaced by two staff members. In the second trial, the five subjects were allowed to say a list of curse words, resulting in an average 30% increase in the time that they could keep their hands in the ice.

=== Gas Canister Rocket ===
Myth statement	Status	Notes
If the propane tank on a barbecue grill is exposed to fire, it can rupture explosively and propel itself 150 ft (46 m) into the air.	Plausible	The Build Team constructed a shed to California building code, placed a grill (with a full tank) inside, and stocked it with wood and charcoal to ensure a long and hot fire. When they ignited the shed, the pressure relief valve on the propane tank eventually opened and vented the gas. For all subsequent trials, Grant disabled the valve on every tank. The second trial involved a tank placed directly on a propane-fired burner; this time, the tank exploded and threw shrapnel up to 300 ft (91 m) in all directions. In a third test, the team bored a hole partway through the tank's base to simulate an old tank that had partially rusted through, and saw it peel itself apart from the bottom up. Reasoning that the tank might need to have some vapor space in order to launch, they repeated the test with a partially filled tank and got it to fly 60 ft (18 m) into the air while remaining intact. The team declared the myth plausible at this point, then continued working in an attempt to get a higher flight. Tory built a launch guide and set up a 9 mm pistol to fire upward into the base of the tank as it sat on the burner, creating an instant nozzle. With the fire going and the tank about to burst, the team triggered the pistol, and the resulting blast sent the tank into a high, spinning trajectory—enough to convince them that a propane tank could become a rocket under the right conditions.

== Episode 143 – "Mythssion Control" ==
- Original air date: May 5, 2010

=== Crash Force ===
Jamie and Adam revisited the Compact Compact myth after fans complained about a claim Jamie made in the earlier episode. During the investigation, he had said that two cars hitting each other at 50 mph (80 km/h) is "equivalent to a single impact going into a solid wall at 100 miles an hour". This was disputed by fans claiming that according to Newton's third law, two cars hitting each other at 50 mph is the same as one car crashing into a wall at 50 mph.

Myth statement	Status	Notes
Two cars crashing into each other at 50 mph will exert the same force as a single car hitting a wall at 50 mph.	Confirmed	In their small-scale tests, the MythBusters compressed clay with swinging hammers at two different speeds (1× and 2× speeds). Their results showed that two objects hitting each other at 1× speed will cause 1× damage. In their full-scale tests, the MythBusters crashed two cars into a wall at 50 and 100 mph as references. They then had two cars going at 50 mph collide into each other. After the results were surveyed, it was clear that the two cars suffered damage identical to the car that crashed into the wall at 50 mph. The MythBusters explained that was possible through Newton's third law of motion. Even though there was twice the force generated from both cars, that force also had to be divided between the increased mass of both cars as well.

=== Knock Your Socks Off Revisit ===
The fans put forward a number of arguments, citing that the Build Team did not have a proper human analogue and that they used elastic socks instead of non-elastic ones. The Build Team also decided to see whether hairy or hairless legs would be a factor in the myth.

Myth statement	Status	Notes
It is possible to literally knock someone's socks off.	Confirmed	The Build Team tested various types of socks on both hairy and hairless legs to see which sock could be pulled off the easiest. The Build Team then concluded that a non-elastic woven wool sock on a hairless leg would be the best possible combination. They then built ballistics gel legs covered in lamb skin to simulate human legs. The Build Team tested several punches: the uppercut, the right hook, and the body blow. However, none of the punches managed to remove the socks, even with superhuman strength. In order to see what it would take to knock a person's socks off, the team hit Buster with a girder mounted on a moving truck. While the truck failed to knock Buster's socks off at 40 mph (64 km/h) (such a blow would deliver 4,000 times the force a boxer can punch with), the team saw on reviewed footage that the socks were sliding off; a second run at 65 mph (105 km/h), and with force equating to 10,000 times what a boxer can put out, finally sent the socks flying off Buster's feet. While the myth was confirmed, the Build Team pointed out that they had to use an "astronomical" amount of force in order to achieve it.

== Episode 144 – "Duct Tape Hour 2" ==
- Original air date: May 12, 2010

=== 102 Uses for Duct Tape ===
The MythBusters and the Build Team investigate whether the "handyman's secret weapon" can be used to...

Myth statement	Status	Notes
...build a usable bridge across a chasm.	Confirmed	Adam and Jamie began by applying force to the middle of a strip of duct tape in order to determine its breaking strength. Finding a result of 67.3 lbf (299.4 N), they built up strands from layers of tape, and Adam experimented with weaving them together to strengthen the design. They settled on a rope bridge with a 10-layer walkway, two handrails, and two stabilizing rails. Adam and Jamie took the bridge to Mare Island Naval Shipyard, where they could set it up across a 104-foot (32 m) gap with a 50-foot (15 m) drop. During test runs to pre-stretch the parts and remove the tape's elasticity, they decided to connect the walkway and handrails with struts in hopes of reducing the wobble. A total of 196 rolls of tape was used to build the finished bridge, which was connected to steel frames on opposite ends of the gap. Adam and Jamie both made the crossing successfully, though Jamie had a much harder time keeping his balance due to his fear of heights and/or the stress of Adam's previous crossing. Jamie commented that the elastic nature of the tape made it a poor choice for building bridges.
...hold a completely dismantled car together so that it can be safely driven at high speed.	Confirmed	Kari tore apart a car's body and frame with the help of a squad of San Francisco firefighters. Grant and Tory then reassembled it with tape, and the Build Team took it to Naval Air Station Alameda, where they set up an obstacle course on the runway to put as much stress on the car as possible. With Kari driving 40–60 mph (64–97 km/h), the car held together through 10 laps. Next, the team did some off-road driving in the rain; the engine stalled after several minutes, but the tape did not fail.
...hold a car in place.	Confirmed	The Build Team hooked a force meter between a car's rear bumper and a telephone pole and found that the car could pull with a force of 1,300 lbf (590 kgf). Based on the breaking strength data from the bridge testing, they wrapped five rolls of tape around the car and pole to bind the two together. When Grant stepped on the gas, the car stayed in place even as the tires began to smoke, with only one strip of tape breaking.
...stop a car going 60 mph (97 km/h).	Busted	The Build Team placed two concrete barricades on the Alameda runway and used one roll of tape to make a single thick strand strung between them. Driving at 40 mph (64 km/h), Tory was able to break through easily. For further tests, the team used 100 rolls of tape to make a 3-inch (7.6 cm)-thick wall, which they hung between the barricades, and towed the car into it while Grant steered remotely. On the first test, a problem with the tow cable caused the car to hit one of the barricades; the tape took a glancing blow but did not break. The second test ended with one of the wall's anchor points breaking loose, while the wall itself remained intact. In the third and final test, the car hit the wall dead center and broke through, but not before the tape had stretched nearly 6 ft (1.8 m). Based on the amount of time and material that would be needed to construct a workable car stopper, the team declared the myth busted.

== Episode 145 – "Waterslide Wipeout" ==
- Original air date: May 19, 2010

=== Waterslide Wipeout ===
Based on a viral video that can be found on YouTube, this myth was done by the MythBusters by fan request.

Myth statement	Status	Notes
A person can slide down a 165 ft (50 m) waterslide, launch off a ramp at the end, fly 115 ft (35 m), and accurately land in a small, distant pool.	Busted	The MythBusters first built a scale model of the slide, and they discovered that the concept was plausible. They then built the full-size ramp with dimensions based on thorough analysis of the video. For safety reasons, the MythBusters built the slide next to a manmade lake (38.399581°N 120.995017°W) so that they could avoid injury if they missed the target. After several runs, the MythBusters concluded that the 115-foot (35 m) flight distance was impossible, as they could travel only at a maximum distance of 72 ft (22 m) with a peak speed of 30 mph (48 km/h). In order to achieve the 115-foot (35 m) distance, they would need to be traveling at least 40 mph (64 km/h). They then tested the accuracy of the slide, and they found that the accuracy was fairly consistent. However, because they could not achieve the distance portion of the myth, they were forced to rate the myth busted. Just to make absolutely sure, the MythBusters contacted the people responsible for making the video, and they confirmed that the video was made using computer-generated imagery.

=== Left Hand Turn ===
This myth was based on claims that delivery companies use programs that calculate routes using as few left turns as possible to maximize fuel efficiency.

Myth statement	Status	Notes
Per the policy of an unnamed package delivery company, driving a delivery truck route that takes mostly right turns (instead of both right and left turns) is more fuel efficient than driving normally, because the vehicle uses up more gas idling while waiting for traffic to clear on a left turn than taking a right turn. The Build Team generally assumed that the only alternative to a left turn was to replace each one with three right turns in the same area.	Confirmed	For their first test, the Build Team drove a regular-size car on a controlled course. On the first run, they drove the car around a block using a left hand turn, but they had to wait for a turn signal. In the second run, they instead took three right turns to bypass the signal, but the route was longer. The results showed that the car managed to cover more distance in less time taking right turns compared to left turns while consuming only less than one percent more fuel. For a real-world result, the Build Team obtained a full-size delivery truck, with the objective of delivering packages to several locations scattered throughout San Francisco. For their second run, they drove exactly the same route, but they replaced each left turn with three right turns. Both runs included the treacherous Lombard Street hill. After reviewing their results, the Build Team discovered that the right turn route was more fuel efficient with a 3% difference, despite having to drive a longer distance. Kari then pointed out that this would be an ideal strategy for delivery trucks in urban environments but would not work as well with regular cars.

== Episode 146 – "Fireball Stun Gun" ==
- Original air date: June 2, 2010

=== Fireball Stun Gun ===
Myth statement	Status	Notes
A taser being used on a target covered with pepper spray will cause the target to catch on fire (inspired by the 2008 CSI: Crime Scene Investigation episode entitled "The Theory of Everything", which featured Adam and Jamie in cameo roles observing it happen).	Plausible	First, Adam and Jamie attempted the myth exactly as it appeared on the show, by firing a taser at a flannel shirt doused with a can of police-issue pepper spray just as Nick Stokes (George Eads) did in the episode in front of them, but they failed to achieve any combustion. They then decided to analyze the individual parts of the myth, basing their analysis on the fire triangle. Reasoning that oxygen was no issue, they studied their ignition method by examining a stun gun in detail and discovering that it created sparks when in operation—including a sizable spark when a barb gets embedded in the target's clothing instead of its skin—making it a more than viable ignition source. For fuel, Adam and Jamie then tested various pepper spray brands for flammability, and while two of the brands did not react, the other three combusted violently due to their use of flammable propellant (in most cases, oil-based.) Not only that, but they then tested various clothing materials that are used to make flannel shirts to determine which was the most flammable and found that most flammable material to be acrylic fiber. They then combined those three elements and managed to successfully use a stun gun to ignite an acrylic shirt sprayed with the most flammable mace they found. However, the flame was not as intense as that seen on the show, so Adam and Jamie used almost eight cans' worth of the same pepper spray to achieve the fireball seen in "The Theory of Everything". Since the myth required a number of factors to achieve, Adam and Jamie settled on a "plausible" result. To end on a bang, Jamie incinerated an acrylic-clad metal dummy "perp" using a flamethrower at the bomb range.

=== Fireworks Man ===
Myth statement	Status	Notes
A man can attach 400 rockets to himself, launch off a ramp, fly over 150 ft (45.7 m), and land safely in a lake.	Busted	The Build Team first tested various high-powered rockets to see which ones could generate the most thrust. However, they discovered that none of the rockets commercially available in the United States could lift a person in the numbers stated in the myth. To solve this problem, the Build Team decided to duplicate more powerful European-made rockets and found them suitable for their needs. The Build Team then tested various small-scale rocket designs to see which would be the most successful. During the full-scale test, Buster managed to successfully launch off the ramp, but he quickly lost control and fell into the lake well short of the 150 feet (46 m). However, even though Buster would have survived the launch, the fact that the rig did not work and that any amateur's attempt would not meet the same quality led the Build Team to reluctantly bust the myth. This myth was revisited in Fireworks Man 2, and its verdict, with the exception of the safe landing, overturned.

== Episode 147 – "Flu Fiction" ==
- Original air date: June 9, 2010

=== Fever Pitch ===
Adam and Jamie explore three myths associated with the common cold.

Myth statement	Status	Notes
A sneeze can leave a person's nose/mouth at 100 mph (160 km/h), roughly the same as a Category 2 hurricane.	Busted	Adam and Jamie used snuff to irritate their mucous membranes and force themselves to sneeze. Droplets from Adam's and Jamie's sneezes traveled at 35 mph (56 km/h) and 39 mph (63 km/h), respectively.
Droplets from a sneeze can travel up to 30 ft (9.1 m).	Busted	To get a visual indication of distance, Adam mixed cherry drink powder into the snuff and sneezed over a 30-foot (9.1 m)-long strip of white paper. When this method failed to show any marks, he and Jamie tried taking a mouthful of a small amount of food coloring just before sneezing. This idea worked, giving a maximum distance of 17 ft (5.2 m) for Adam and 13 ft (4.0 m) for Jamie.
Nasal secretions from a person with a cold can spread so far and so quickly that anyone in the vicinity can become contaminated.	Confirmed	Adam and Jamie consulted with an otolaryngologist and learned that a person with a cold may secrete up to 60 milliliters of mucus per hour. Jamie built a rig from a syringe and tubing to match that drip rate with fluorescent dye, and Adam wore it by his nose as he did model-building work. After one hour, he and everything he had touched were stained with the dye. Adam and Jamie then set up a party for Adam to host, with three "germaphobe" guests (Kari, Grant, and Tory, who were briefed to try to avoid contact with Adam) and three unsuspecting ones. Thirty minutes later, Adam, the whole table, and every guest except Kari—who admitted that she actually was a germaphobe—were heavily contaminated. In a second experiment in which Adam consciously did his best to avoid physical contact (such as bumping elbows with his guests instead of shaking hands and asking the guests to pass out items to each other), all six guests came up clean. Adam and Jamie declared the myth confirmed at this point, commenting that a healthy person would find it very difficult to avoid being contaminated by a sick one who did not attempt to keep from spreading his/her germs.

=== Tornado Decapitation ===
Myth statement	Status	Notes
Tornado-force winds can propel window glass with enough speed to decapitate a person.	Confirmed	Kari and Tory obtained a pig spine with skin and muscle, trimmed it down to resemble an elongated neck, and attached a dummy head. The Build Team then obtained several 1/8-inch (3.2 mm)-thick glass panes that conformed to building codes for houses in tornado-prone areas, and began throwing them at "Neck Man" by hand. They had difficulty reaching a suitable combination of speed and accuracy; none of their throws inflicted more than a minor wound. Tory then built a frame to attach to a pickup truck, with a heavy 14.3-pound (6.5 kg) glass sheet loosely mounted to hit Neck Man edge-on but break loose just before impact. The first attempt, at 80 mph (129 km/h)—the equivalent kinetic energy of a light pane traveling 300 mph (483 km/h) in an F5 tornado—sliced the head off. A second test at 40 mph (64 km/h) (150 mph (241 km/h) for a light pane in a less powerful F2 tornado) also cut completely through the neck. However, the glass did not break out of its holder, indicating that the momentum of the truck may have affected the result. Back at the workshop, the team built a rig to throw 1/4-inch (6.4 mm)-thick panes (twice as heavy as the original ones) at 70 mph (113 km/h). After several tries, they were able to score a hit that completely and cleanly severed the head, leading them to declare the myth confirmed.

== Episode SP14 – "Top 25 Moments" ==
- Original air date: June 16, 2010

This episode is a countdown of the cast's 25 favorite myths and moments to date, with comments from Adam, Jamie, and the Build Team. This was an 86-minute-long special.

#	Name (in countdown)	Myth featured	Comments
25	JATO Rocket Car	Jet Assisted Chevy	First myth tested
24	Guns & Ammo	Tree Machine Gun	Frequent use of various firearms on the show
23	Science Is Golden	Bullets Fired Up	Scientific analysis used in exploring myths
22	Failure Is Always an Option	Supersize Rocket Car	Experiments going wrong in unexpected ways
21	World Firsts	Breaking Glass	First "World First" – First time a person had been filmed breaking a glass with their voice
20	Mean Machines	Steam Powered Machine Gun	Massive and intricate builds for testing myths
19	MythBusters Dress Code	Various	Safety gear and ridiculous costumes used by the cast
18	Underwater Car	Underwater Car	Demonstrating survival skills some viewers were able to actually use in a real-life situation
17	Not So Steely Stomachs	Various	Cast members vomiting on camera
16	Surprise! Surprise!	Bull in a China Shop	Unexpected results from an experiment
15	Buster: Honorary MythBuster	Exploding Pants	The trials and tribulations of Buster
14	Duct Tapetastic	Duct Tape Sailboat	The cast finds new uses for duct tape
13	Weird & Wonderful	Vacuum Toilet	Most bizarre "what the hell are we doing?" moments
12	Lunar Lunacy	NASA Moon Landing	A story intended to promote critical thinking among viewers
11	Shark Tales	Playing Dead	Shark-related myths
10	Flatus Burning	Lighting the Emission	A segment that had not previously aired on the show
9	Human Guinea Pigs	Various	Cast members taking part in stunts and physical testing
8	Bring Out the Blimp	Hindenburg Mystery	An experiment whose dramatic outcome matched closely with the real-world event on which it was based
7	One Line Wonders	Various	Cast members' memorable lines and recurring themes
6	Alcatraz Escape	Escape from Alcatraz	A classic story that left several questions unanswered even after it was finished
5	Car Drop	Racing Gravity	The Build Team's favorite myth
4	Accidents Do Happen	Various	Montage of Adam and Tory's frequent mishaps on camera
3	Rocketry in Motion	Compact Compact Supersized, Snowplow Rocket Replication	The use of rocket engines in revisiting a pair of myths
2	Lead Balloon	Lead Balloon	Adam and Jamie's favorite myth
1	Explosive Fan Favorites	Several, with the main, final representation being the exploding cement truck from Cement Mix-Up	A collection of favorite explosions, as chosen by fans and cast members set to the finale of the 1812 Overture

== Episode 148 – "Hair of the Dog" ==
- Original air date: October 6, 2010

=== Beat the Bloodhound, Part 2 ===
This was a revisit of the Fool the Bloodhound myth from 2007. Adam and Jamie investigated new suggestions for evading detection by a scent hound, using the same dog (Morgan) and handler from that earlier episode. Given a five-minute head start, Jamie fled while using...

Myth statement	Status	Notes
...a literal red herring.	Busted	Jamie spread canned herring across his path in an attempt to throw Morgan off the scent. Morgan stopped to eat the fish and passed the point where Jamie turned off the main trail, but Morgan later doubled back and found him.
...a suit treated with cleaning products intended to neutralize odors.	Busted	Despite Jamie's suit and choice of hiding places to shelter himself from the breeze, Morgan found him without difficulty.
...an escape route that crosses a river (rather than a small stream as in 2007).	Busted	Morgan was able to pick up Jamie's scent in the water and find him. Adam and Jamie concluded that the size of the body of water had no effect on a bloodhound's ability to track fugitives.
...a complete full-body cleaning and equipment to mask his scent.	Busted	Jamie scrubbed himself down and rinsed with wipes meant for use by hunters to disguise their scent, then put on a protective suit with a gas mask and air filter to remove odors from his breath. He sprayed a false scent trail using his own wash water, threw the sprayer into the tall grass, and hid. The trail distracted Morgan for a short time, but he soon found the sprayer and tracked Jamie to his hiding place.

Adam and Jamie also explored a bloodhound's ability to single out a suspect from a group.

Myth statement	Status	Notes
If several suspects flee at once, the dog can find a particular one after being given his or her scent.	Plausible	Five men each provided one unwashed shirt, then fled together for a short distance before splitting up. Morgan was given one of the five shirts for a scent, then began to track; he initially had the correct trail, but he soon became confused and could not find it again. In a second test, he did find the correct suspect, leading Adam and Jamie to conclude that picking a single suspect out of a lineup in this manner was a plausible but unreliable method. However, it was noted that dogs can be trained to track multiple targets—and that Morgan had not received such training.

=== Beat the Sniffer Dog ===
Four contraband-detecting dogs—Buck, Rex, Gypsy, Max—and their handlers took part in a series of tests arranged by the Build Team. They investigated the possibility of fooling the dogs by...

Myth statement	Status	Notes
...masking the scent of the contraband with a much stronger one.	Busted	The contraband was packed into a plastic container with one of five strong scent materials (coffee, peanut butter, citronella, perfume, and bleach) and hidden in a large warehouse filled with props. Rex was able to find the package every time, with only the citronella slowing him down to any degree.
...using an ultrasonic dog repellent device.	Busted	Kari tested out such a device on her own two puppies to verify its effectiveness. The Build Team then set up a typical outdoor-concert scenario, with over 200 people gathered in a parking lot and possible distractions for the dog: a car with stereo blaring and a fast food truck. One person was given the contraband and the repellent device to trigger whenever Gypsy came too close, but she was able to ignore it and find her target.
...distracting the dog with another scent.	Busted	The concert scenario was reset, and a female dog in heat was placed near the person with the contraband, in an attempt to distract the male sniffing dog with pheromones. Max did become confused, whereupon his handler removed both him and the female from the area; after a few minutes, Max was brought back in and successfully found the contraband. The handler noted that it is standard procedure to remove all other dogs from the area being searched to prevent this sort of situation.
...packing the contraband with materials intended to cause a false positive and/or repel the handler.	Busted	Tory fitted a false bottom into a suitcase, loaded the contraband into that, and then packed that suitcase and several others with the chosen material. The cases were hidden in a large warehouse full of luggage. Tests with strongly aromatic cheese and sausage, and with dirty diapers from Kari's baby, failed to deter Buck from picking the correct bag or his handler from searching it to find the contraband. The handler noted that both dogs and their handlers are thoroughly trained in seeing through attempts to deceive them.

== Episode 149 – "Storm Chasing Myths" ==
- Original air date: October 13, 2010

Adam and Jamie team up with Sean Casey and Reed Timmer (from the series Storm Chasers) to investigate myths related to the power of tornadoes. The Build Team does not take part in this episode.

The episode includes a memorial to Sanjay Singh, an EMT and "Honorary MythBuster" who died in 2010.

Myth statement	Status	Notes
The Storm Chasers' specially reinforced vehicles can withstand an EF5 tornado with winds up to 250 miles per hour (402 km/h). (They have been exposed to 140–150 mph (225–241 km/h) winds in actual storms.)	Confirmed	At a Michigan airfield used by Kalitta Air, the group used the engines of a Boeing 747 to generate the needed wind forces and speeds, with a vehicle positioned directly behind one engine's exhaust. The first test was carried out at a distance corresponding to 160-mile-per-hour (257 km/h) winds (mid-EF3 tornado range); a passenger car had its hood torn off and was pushed back 50 ft (15 m). The Storm Chasers' vehicles, TIV2 and Dominator, suffered no damage in this trial except for TIV2's door flying open because Sean had forgotten to lock it. Each vehicle's anchor spikes allowed it to keep its position on the ground. In the second test, the vehicles were placed so as to feel the entire 250-mile-per-hour (402 km/h) wind. Within seconds, the car lost its hood and was thrown backward 250 ft (76 m). TIV2 held its position, while Dominator slid across the ground but did not tumble due to its low profile that kept the wind from blowing beneath it. The only signs of damage were a bent anchor spike and a twisted license plate holder, respectively. Noting that an occupant in either vehicle would easily have survived, Adam and Jamie declared the myth confirmed and stenciled their seal of approval on each one.
It is possible to build a personal tornado protection device.	Confirmed	Three criteria were chosen for testing: portability, degree of protection against flying debris, and ability to withstand up to 135-mph winds (the equivalent of an EF3 tornado). Adam and Jamie worked on separate prototypes: an inverted bowl topped by an airfoil to push it into the ground, and a low-profile tent with an anchored base that could pivot to face changing winds. Jamie's design performed considerably better than Adam's and was chosen for full-scale testing. A prototype built from polyethylene, aluminum, ballistic nylon, and duct tape was taken to the Kalitta airfield; it could be folded up and carried in a backpack. For the debris test, Jamie fired wooden cylinders at the shield, using his soda-can launcher from the myth Cup vs Car. Buster and Adam each took a turn inside the shield, with no ill effects. Adam then stood in the 747's exhaust until he lost his footing, which occurred at 130 mph (209 km/h). This wind speed was used as a minimum that the shield would have to endure without any injury to Jamie inside. It tore apart at 135 mph (217 km/h) due to failure of the attachment points between the panels. After these were redesigned and bolted, Jamie was able to hold his ground in 180-mile-per-hour (290 km/h) winds—the equivalent of an EF4 tornado. The front side of the MythBusters' personal tornado protective device The rear side of the MythBusters' personal tornado protective device

== Episode 150 – "Cold Feet" ==
- Original air date: October 20, 2010

=== When Feces Hit the Fan ===
Myth statement	Status	Notes
When feces hits a fan, everybody around the fan will get hit by it.	Plausible	Since using real feces was too dangerous (and smelly), the MythBusters created their own artificial feces for testing. Against a plastic 12-inch (30.5 cm) fan, the feces was not spread very well. The metal 20-inch (51 cm) fan could spread the feces much better, but the MythBusters still were not satisfied with the results. They then tried feces with differing consistencies and found that softer feces was the best choice. However, the 12- and 20-inch fans were still unable to completely spread the feces around. The MythBusters then upgraded to a 30-inch (76 cm) fan and got better results, with feces being flung as far as 40 ft (12 m) as well as hitting all of the targets. The MythBusters then used an even larger fan and threw feces at it from all directions, which successfully threw feces everywhere. The MythBusters decided that the myth was plausible under the right circumstances.

=== Cold Feet ===
This myth is based on the popular saying "getting cold feet".

Myth statement	Status	Notes
Your feet get physically colder when you are afraid of doing something.	Plausible	The Build Team first measured the temperature of their feet by using skin sensors and found the average temperature of a human foot is 96 °F (36 °C). To test this myth, each member of the Build Team was given a specific test that would make him or her feel the most uncomfortable to perform. Tory, being uncomfortable with high heights, rode as a passenger in a stunt plane as it performed numerous aerial maneuvers by Sean D. Tucker. The data showed that Tory's feet got colder only shortly before each stunt was performed, but the temperature changed only by a degree. Grant, being uncomfortable with fish and bugs touching him, was exposed to tarantulas that crawled all over his head in a specialized container. During the test, the sensors recorded Grant's foot temperature dropping almost 15 °F (8.3 °C). Kari, being a vegetarian, was forced to eat a live wax worm and cricket. Her foot temperature also dropped 15 °F during the test. The Build Team declared the myth plausible since all three of them experienced temperature drops in their feet. Grant explained that this is most likely due to the fact that when humans feel fear, the outer blood vessels in the hands and feet constrict, drawing blood and warmth away from the extremities and towards the muscles needed to either fight or run. The myth was only deemed plausible due to Tory's test results and the small sample size.

== Episode 151 – "Tablecloth Chaos" ==
- Original air date: October 27, 2010

Adam and Jamie explore a large-scale version of an old magic trick, while the Build Team investigates a popular belief about brain activity.

=== Tablecloth Chaos ===
Myth statement	Status	Notes
A motorcycle can yank the cloth off a fully set banquet table without disturbing the place settings (inspired by a viral video that purports to show this feat).	Busted	For preliminary testing, Adam set up a small table and cloth, with a full wine bottle, a glass, and a vase of flowers. After trying several combinations of cloth material and weight of items on the table, he was able to pull the cloth out and leave the setting intact. Lightweight satin cloths gave the best result, and the trailing edge of the cloth had to be flush with the table to reduce friction against the edge. Large-scale tests were first set up in a hangar at Naval Air Station Alameda, involving a 24-foot (7.3 m)-long table with two dozen place settings. In the first test, Jamie hooked his sport cycle directly to the cloth; accelerating from a standing start, he pulled nearly everything off the table. Further trials—first in the hangar, with 200 ft (61 m) of slack and the cycle at 60 mph (97 km/h); then on the airfield, with 600 ft (183 m) and 100 mph (161 km/h)—left more items standing, but they still overturned several of the settings. Finally, to replicate the results of the video, Adam applied dry lubricant to the tablecloth and then covered it with hard plastic, upon which the settings were placed. Although Jamie successfully yanked out the cloth from a standing start, he and Adam declared the myth busted due to the need to fake the setup.

=== Brain Drain ===
Myth statement	Status	Notes
Humans use only 10% of their available brain capacity.	Busted	After Grant consulted with a neurosurgeon about measuring activity in the various parts of the brain, Kari set up a series of four tests targeting memory, calculation ability, decision making, and visual information processing. Grant took the tests as an electroencephalogram recorded his brain activity; the results indicated a normal level, but they could not provide an exact percentage since it monitored activity only on the surface of his brain. For a more representative image, the Build Team visited UCSF to do a magnetoencephalogram study. Tory took the tests this time, resulting in an overall activity of 35%. In a third trial, this one involving a functional MRI scan, Tory registered 15% while at rest but 30% as he told a story with the intent of activating as many areas of his brain as possible. Based on these totals, the team declared the myth busted.

== Episode 152 – "Arrow Machine Gun" ==
- Original US air date: November 3, 2010
- Original UK air date: October 25, 2010

=== Arrow Machine Gun ===
Myth statement	Status	Notes
The ancient Greeks designed and/or built a weapon that was capable of fully automatic fire using arrows.	Plausible	See also: Polybolos Based on fragments of design information from historical records, Adam and Jamie began to put together a period-appropriate weapon platform, using sprockets, a chain, and a hand crank as the heart of the reloading mechanism. After some preliminary tests in the M5 workshop, they took the prototype outside for further trials. Three criteria were initially chosen to evaluate its performance: range of at least 200 yards (183 m), rate of fire at least 5 rounds per minute, and enough accuracy to hit a human-sized target. A fourth criterion, ability to hit targets faster than a human archer, was added later. In the first field tests (37.58874°N 121.88404°W), the weapon achieved a 230-yard (210 m) range; in an accuracy test, though, the mechanism repeatedly broke down and further shop work was needed. Adam and Jamie added wheels for maneuverability, as well as an angle finder to adjust the trajectory, and fine-tuned the reloading mechanism. They set up 5 targets at 90 yards (82 m) and brought in professional archer Brady Ellison to provide a benchmark for comparison. He hit the targets in 2 minutes, using 11 arrows. After further breakdowns and repair work, Adam and Jamie accomplished the feat with 15 arrows in 1 minute and 50 seconds. They classified the myth as plausible since they could find no records of this weapon actually being built and used in combat.

=== Tipsy vs. Tired ===
Myth statement	Status	Notes
Driving while suffering from sleep deprivation is more dangerous than driving under the influence of a minor amount of alcohol.	Confirmed	Grant designed courses to test both stop-and-go city driving with various distractions, and highway driving with long, monotonous stretches of road. For the "tipsy" test, Kari and Tory each took enough drinks to give them a blood alcohol content just beneath 0.08%, the legal limit in California. Kari made 7 mistakes in the city test, then veered out of her lane 104 times (58 seconds altogether) during the highway test. Tory's results were 2 mistakes and 4 times/1 second, respectively. Once Kari and Tory had both sobered up, they had to remain awake for 30 hours in the M7 workshop, with various devices to keep them busy. They were not allowed any sugar, caffeine, or other stimulants during this time. The following morning, they drove both courses again for the "tired" test. Kari had 6 mistakes (city) and 210 times out/332 seconds (highway), while Tory had 5 mistakes (city) and 110 times out/77 seconds (highway). Based on the general worsening of their performance after going without sleep, the Build Team declared the myth confirmed.

== Episode 153 – "Mini Myth Madness" ==
- Original air date: November 10, 2010

=== Request Fest ===
As a tribute to their fans, the MythBusters randomly drew six fan-submitted letters and tested the myths and questions in them. One letter contained three separate myths, bringing the total number of tests in this episode to eight.

Myth statement	Status/Result	Notes
A scuba diver can wear a tuxedo underneath his drysuit, go underwater, resurface, strip off his scuba gear, and be able to present the tuxedo perfectly. (This was inspired by the pre-title sequence of Goldfinger.)	Confirmed	Adam and Jamie donned tuxedos after meeting with an image consultant to learn about the particulars of black-tie formal dress. Adam boarded a boat to serve as a comparison standard, while Jamie put on a drysuit and took a 40-minute scuba dive to rendezvous with him. Once Jamie climbed aboard, removed the suit, and brushed himself down, both his tuxedo and Adam's were found to be in presentable condition for a party.
A car's tire pressure can significantly affect its fuel efficiency.	Confirmed	The Build Team ran a car through a test course with regular tire pressure, extremely overinflated and deflated tires, and slightly overinflated and deflated tires, and measured the resulting fuel efficiency for each. The data showed that lower than normal tire pressure resulted in significantly more fuel being consumed, due to a larger amount of surface area in contact with the road to increase friction. Higher than normal pressure did improve fuel efficiency; however, the Build Team discouraged the idea of overinflating tires due to the hazards involved and negligible cost savings.
A laptop can stop a point-blank blast from a shotgun.	Plausible	Using a 12-gauge shotgun, the Build Team fired a load of birdshot at a 4-year-old laptop in a leather bag from point-blank range, with a block of ballistic gelatin behind it to stand for the owner's body. The birdshot easily punctured every area of the laptop that was hit and damaged the gelatin severely. In a second test, the team targeted the battery—the component with the highest density—and found that none of the pellets would go through it. The team classified the myth as plausible since only a very lucky shot would be stopped.
A hair weave can stop a .40 caliber bullet.	Busted	The Build Team replicated the conditions of the news story on which the myth was based, firing at a ballistic-gelatin head through a car's rear windshield from 8 feet (2.4 m) behind it. The bullet easily penetrated the head's hair weave and exited through the front, pulling some of the hair with it. The team hypothesized that in the actual shooting, the bullet may have ricocheted off a metal part before coming to rest near the victim's head, giving the illusion that the weave stopped the bullet.
A refrigerator door can stop a spray of 9mm bullets.	Busted	The Build Team fired numerous 9mm bullets at a modern refrigerator door stocked with items commonly found in refrigerators. Every shot easily penetrated both the door and a block of ballistic gelatin placed behind it, indicating lethal impacts. The team achieved the same result with a double-walled steel refrigerator door from the 1950s.
One of these ways (elbow, hankie, or hand) is the best way to limit the spread of germs created by sneezes.	Use your elbow	Adam and Jamie tested three different techniques of containing sneezes—a hand, an elbow, and a handkerchief—with the help of snuff and food coloring as in the myth Fever Pitch. Adam's sneezes into his hand spread droplets up to 9.5 feet (2.9 m) away, while Jamie's elbow stopped nearly all of the droplets from his sneezes. The few that were not stopped traveled only 0.5 feet (0.15 m). When Adam sneezed into the handkerchief, those droplets also traveled 0.5 feet (0.15 m) but soaked his hand as well. They noted that the germs would quickly spread to both the user's hand and other items that touched the cloth, defeating the purpose of using it. The elbow was judged the most effective device for containing germs from a sneeze.
It is easy to take candy from a baby.	Busted	Adam and Jamie measured the amounts of force required to simply pick up a lollipop versus taking one from a baby. They tried snatching the lollipop from babies of various ages (6–18 months) and found that the babies would actively fight to keep the candy. Younger ones tended to use brute force to hold on to the lollipop, while older ones used different tactics such as crying and moving the candy out of reach. Picking up the candy required 0.08 pounds-force (0.36 N), while taking it from the babies took an average of 2.01 pounds-force (8.9 N), indicating that the latter is actually harder to do than the former.
If a bottle of beer is put in the freezer for long enough, removed while it is still liquid, and given a sudden shock, the beer will instantly freeze solid.	Confirmed	The Build Team left bottles of beer inside a freezer for various times, ranging from 120 minutes to 180 minutes, before removing and striking them. The team found that 180 minutes of cooling time was necessary to allow the instant freezing to occur. The most likely explanation is supercooling, in which a liquid, beer or otherwise, in a very clean container can be cooled below its freezing point, but it will rapidly form crystals and freeze if it is disturbed in any way.

== Episode 154 – "Reverse Engineering" ==
- Original US air date: November 17, 2010
- Original UK air date: November 8, 2010

=== Reverse Engineering ===
Myth statement	Status	Notes
A certain 1970s sports car was so badly designed that it was more aerodynamic if the body were turned backward on the frame.	Busted	The Porsche 928 that was converted to have the driver face the rear view Adam and Jamie first placed a small-scale car model in a water chamber to visualize the airflow around it. Whether it faced forward or reverse, they saw a large area of turbulence above the trailing end. Next, they measured the amount of drag force on the model when placed in a wind tunnel to gauge its aerodynamic character. The results were 0.34 and 0.37 pounds for forward and reverse, respectively. In full-scale testing, Adam drove a Porsche 928 through three tests: a timed quarter-mile, time to accelerate from 0 to 60 mph (0 to 97 km/h), and fuel efficiency for a 1-mile (1.6 km) course at 50 mph (80 km/h). The car's body was then removed, turned around, and reattached to the chassis, and Adam performed the same three tests. The forward car yielded averages of 14.0 seconds in the quarter-mile, 8.0 seconds in acceleration, and 0.87 lb (394.63 g) of fuel used. In reverse, the corresponding results were 16.6 seconds, 8.66 seconds, and 1.25 lb (566.99 g) of fuel; these unusual changes led Adam and Jamie to suspect that the tests were inconclusive. Finally, they brought the cars up to full speed—Adam in the reversed one, Jamie in an unmodified one—then put them into neutral and let them coast to the finish line. Jamie finished the race first, leading him and Adam to conclude that the cars really were more aerodynamic as designed.

=== Surf and Turf ===
Myth statement	Status	Notes
If a car with a surfboard on its roof gets into a 40-mile-per-hour (64 km/h) collision and stops dead, the board will be thrown ahead with enough force to punch through another car's windshield and kill the driver (based on a scene in the film Lethal Weapon 2).	Busted	The Build Team set up a full-scale test, towing a car with a board ("board car") into a parked vehicle ("crash car") set in front of a crash barricade to stop it dead on impact. A third vehicle ("target car") was placed 40 ft (12.2 m) behind the crash car, pointing directly at the oncoming board car. Three attempts to replicate the movie crash failed, with the board pivoting sharply down and/or getting caught in the crash car's wreckage after flying off the roof. Small-scale tests in the water chamber revealed that the board would not generate enough lift force to keep itself on a level path, leading the team to focus simply on the impact of the board against the windshield. Tory built a rig to launch it straight ahead, using bungee cords to provide the needed force; once it was properly calibrated, the team set a target vehicle directly in front and put Buster (outfitted with a human-analog neck) in the driver's seat. The board only glanced off at 40 mph (64 km/h), while at 85 mph (137 km/h), it penetrated partway but was stopped by the safety glass in the windshield. Having failed to replicate either the movie crash or its results, the team declared the myth busted.

== Episode 155 – "Inverted Underwater Car" ==
- Original air date: November 24, 2010

=== Turn Turtle Car ===
Myth statement	Status	Notes
It is more difficult to escape from a sinking car that flips upside down than from one that remains right-side up. (A revisit of 2007's Underwater Car myth)	Confirmed	Jamie built a giant hamster wheel to spin a person underwater in an attempt to induce disorientation. Though Adam was consistently able to swim to the surface, Jamie had some trouble doing so. They arranged a full-scale test at a manmade lake, placing a car on a barge and setting it up to flip upside down when pulled into the water; the maximum intended depth was 15 feet (4.6 m). Adam sat in the driver's seat as in the myth Underwater Car, while emergency air tanks and a safety diver were also placed inside. His goal was to escape without either breaking a window or using the air supply. As soon as the car hit the water, it turned over and the windshield broke and began to leak water. Adam had to wait to open a door until the car was completely filled, becoming heavily disoriented as the car did two more half-flips. He eventually surfaced, but he admitted that he had had to use the air supply, and he and Jamie declared the myth confirmed.

=== Gas Room Boom ===
Myth statement	Status	Notes
In a room filled with flammable gas, firing a pistol through a full carton of milk will prevent its muzzle flash from igniting the gas (inspired by a scene from the film Kiss the Girls).	Busted	The Build Team constructed a full-scale test kitchen, with typical fixtures and appliances as well as a breakaway wall to relieve the pressure from any explosions. Setting up Buster and a dummy to duplicate the film scene, the team pumped in enough methane (representing natural gas) to achieve a 10% concentration, the center of the gas's flammability range in air. Firing a 9 mm SIG Sauer pistol failed to produce an explosion, whether or not a carton of milk was placed in front of it. The team then built a bulletproof glass box to serve as a small-scale kitchen, pumped in the methane, and tested three different weapons: the SIG Sauer, a 9 mm Glock pistol loaded with +P rounds, and a .44 Magnum revolver. None of these caused the methane to explode when fired, so the team switched to more flammable hydrogen gas. Without the milk, the Glock gave an explosion where the SIG Sauer did not, so they built a dollhouse-sized kitchen for mid-scale testing with the milk in place. This test ended in a blast that blew out the walls and roof, leading the team to classify both the movie myth and its underlying concept as busted.

== Episode 156 – "Bug Special" ==
- Original air date: December 1, 2010

=== Laptop Lift ===
The MythBusters take a crack at a bee-related myth based on a viral video.

Myth statement	Status	Notes
One thousand honey bees are capable of lifting a laptop.	Busted	Adam and Jamie started by covering a laptop with glue and bee-friendly adhesive. They then started attaching bees to the laptop, but they quickly found that the video's showing of using a single frame of bees was inaccurate. At least five frames were needed to achieve an appearance similar to the video, but the bees could not lift the laptop. Small-scale tests indicated that an average honeybee could carry 96 milligrams of weight; based on this result, it would take at least 23,000 bees to lift the laptop. Adam counted the number of bees per square inch in the frames, measured the laptop's surface area, and calculated that only 2,300 bees would fit onto it. Declaring the myth busted at this point, Jamie used toy helicopters to show that any lift generated by the bees' wings would be counteracted by the force of air being pushed down onto the payload, making it impossible to lift anything as shown in the video. Adam and Jamie also demonstrated that bees' ability to work together was limited, as one further test with two bees attached to a single "mini-laptop" payload resulted in the bees being unable to get the mini-laptop off the ground. Finally, to show how the video might have been faked, Adam and Jamie devised a rig that allowed them to attach fishing line to the laptop and then hoist it with an off-camera stick or handle once the laptop was covered with bees.

=== Fly vs Water ===
According to the Build Team, this was one of the most demanded myths from the fans. The popular theory is that since water refracts light, it would confuse flies' compound eyes.

Myth statement	Status	Notes
Bags of water hung from the ceiling can repel flies.	Busted	The Build Team built a rig consisting of three chambers separated by trapdoors. The first chamber would hold the flies, the second would hold some rotten meat, and the third would hold both rotten meat and a bag of water. The team then released over 5,000 flies from the first chamber and waited to see how many flies would go into each of the other two. After the chambers were sealed off, they let all the flies die and collected the corpses to weigh for comparison. The chambers with and without the water contained 35 and 20 grams of flies, respectively, busting the myth.

=== Biker vs Bug ===
Myth statement	Status	Notes
A person riding a motorcycle at high speed can be killed if he or she impacts a bug.	Plausible	Doing some research, the Build Team discovered that the most vulnerable point on the human body was the throat; an impact with 76 pounds of force could cause the windpipe to swell and suffocate the victim. They attached a force plate to a mannequin torso, put it in a sidecar attached to a motorcycle, and had Tory drive at 85 miles per hour so that the plate would hit an insect suspended at throat height. Tests with a common fly, a cicada, and a Goliath beetle (the largest flying insect the team could find) yielded 10, 37, and 100 pounds of force, respectively. To investigate the speeds needed to inflict a lethal injury at head or chest height, the team set up an air cannon to fire a Goliath beetle analog at the force plate. An impact at 120 mph gave 285 pounds of force, while a test at 200 mph (described as the speed of the fastest motorcyclist ever to get a traffic ticket) yielded 500 pounds. Although neither of these was high enough to result in a fatal injury, the team deemed the myth plausible, since a heavy enough insect hitting just the right spot on a rider could lead to his or her death.

== Episode 157 – "President's Challenge" ==
- Original air date: December 8, 2010

=== Archimedes Solar Ray 3.0 ===
President Obama challenges Adam and Jamie to revisit the Ancient Death Ray myth originally aired September 29, 2004, and subsequently followed up in a 2006 revisit.

Myth statement	Status	Notes
Up to 500 people with mirrors can focus the sun's light enough to set a wooden ship ablaze.	Re-busted	Recalling their experience with previous experiments, Adam and Jamie knew that it would be extremely difficult to coordinate all 500 people into focusing their mirrors into a single spot, so they set about trying to construct aiming systems to assist the shield bearers. While Jamie's efforts with a gunsight system proved unsuccessful, Adam found that stretching a net across the front of the mirrors provided a usable visual guide for aiming the beams. After a test in the workshop with 12 people holding mirrors proved the feasibility of this method, 500 double-sided mirrors were delivered, and the crew covered one side of each with bronze Mylar film to represent the Greek mirrors, leaving the other side intact. In the full-scale test, 500 high school students stood in for the Greek soldiers trying to set a boat's sails on fire, using first the bronze and then the modern mirrors. Both of these efforts failed, as did a third trial in which the boat was pulled close enough to the shore for Jamie (as an invading captain on the boat) to throw tennis balls and hit the students. Though Adam and Jamie declared the myth busted, Jamie noted that the reflections from the mirrors were extremely distracting and had blinded him temporarily, and that this may have been Archimedes' true intent in recommending their use in warfare.

=== Car Flip ===
Myth statement	Status	Notes
A strong enough punch, directed down onto the hood of a moving SUV, can cause it to somersault into the air. This myth was based on a scene from the film Hellboy.	Busted	The Build Team first did some tests to determine the amount of force needed on the hood in order to get the SUV's front end to touch the ground. They found that a total of 5,000 pounds was required, so Tory built a giant fist from a steel cylinder to be dropped from a crane to give that much force on impact. The first few tests revealed problems with positioning and timing of the drop to hit the hood; after the team fine-tuned the system, they scored a solid hit but failed to flip the SUV. Reverting to small-scale testing with a toy SUV, the team experimented with combinations of fist weight, vehicle speed, and center of gravity but still could not get a flip. They declared the myth busted at this point, then attached a long lever to a full-sized SUV's roof in order to move the impact force away from the front axle, which served as the fulcrum for the car after impact. Even with this modification, the rear end only flipped 45 degrees into the air and did not somersault forward.

== Episode 158 – "Green Hornet Special" ==
- Original air date: December 15, 2010

Seth Rogen, star of the 2011 film The Green Hornet, gives the cast two myths to test concerning the Green Hornet's car, Black Beauty.

=== Explosive Escape ===
Myth statement	Status	Notes
If a car is completely buried with a bulldozer parked on top, it can set off onboard explosives to throw the bulldozer out of the way without injuring the passengers, as long as they shield themselves properly.	Busted	Adam and Jamie fitted a car's front seat backs with armor plating and loaded in 16 pounds of explosives, replicating Black Beauty's rockets and seats. They then fitted two dummies (representing the Green Hornet and his assistant Kato) with pressure sensors and placed them in the backseat behind the armor. The car was then lowered sideways into a trench and buried, and a bulldozer was placed on top. When the explosives were set off, they created enough of a crater for the bulldozer to sink partway in; however, both the car and the dummies were severely damaged, and the sensors were destroyed. Declaring the movie myth busted at this point, Adam and Jamie turned their focus to making the bulldozer fly. They built two steel models and tried two different explosives: 4 pounds each of TNT (high speed) and ANFO (low speed). The TNT blasted one model to pieces, while the ANFO tore the other apart at the welds and threw the pieces far enough to convince Adam of its usefulness in this respect. For a full-scale test, he and Jamie buried 250 pounds of ANFO under a bulldozer, with the goal of moving it away without destroying it. The resulting blast ripped the machine apart, left a deep crater, and threw pieces over 500 feet (150 m). Adam and Jamie commented that any explosive charge big enough to move the bulldozer would certainly kill the occupants of the buried car.

=== Elevator Car Cut ===
Myth statement	Status	Notes
If a bullet-riddled car drives halfway into an elevator that begins to ascend, the car will be cut in half when the elevator reaches ceiling level, and the front end can be driven out.	Busted (1st part), plausible (2nd part)	Kari converted an actual 1964–65 Imperial into a Black Beauty replica, and Grant and Tory fired over 200 rounds of submachine gun ammunition into it to replicate the movie car's condition. The Build Team then constructed a rig to replicate the elevator, using a forklift that could generate 35,000 pounds of lifting force. When they put the car in position and lifted, it got caught and crushed at "ceiling" level without being sliced in half. The team declared the first half of the myth busted, but Seth "revealed" that Black Beauty was equipped with a system to split itself in emergencies. Concentrating on the possibility of driving the front half, they cut the rear half off another car. After several adjustments, they were able to get the front started and drive it a short distance until it hit a wall. Seth then claimed that Black Beauty had a reserve fuel tank under its hood, so the team installed one in their half-car and took it to Petaluma Speedway for one more test. This time, Tory was able to complete 20 laps at speeds up to 40 miles per hour. The team decided that the idea of driving the half-car was plausible, if the driver made the needed extensive modifications ahead of time.

== Episode 159 – "Operation Valkyrie" ==
- Original air date: December 22, 2010

=== Valkyrie Boom ===
Myth statement	Status	Notes
Operation Valkyrie, a World War II plot to assassinate Adolf Hitler with a bomb, failed only because Hitler's meeting was moved from an underground bunker to an aboveground conference room with windows.	Busted	As Jamie examined photographs and reports of the explosion, Adam used a water tank to demonstrate the ability of shock waves to rebound off solid surfaces. For a small-scale test, Adam built models of both the bunker and the conference room from steel plates. When a blasting cap was set off in each, the peak pressures were measured at 14 and 55 pounds per square inch for the room and the bunker, respectively. To set up a full-scale test, two intermodal containers were outfitted as replicas of the two scenes. Adam cut window openings and fitted glass for the conference room, while Jamie dug a trench and partially buried the bunker due to time constraints. Each was equipped with a rupture disc set to burst at 100 psi, a block of polyurethane foam to gauge shrapnel injuries to Hitler, and a charge of C-4 with the same explosive power as the actual bomb. Peak pressures were measured at 18 psi (room) and 30 psi (bunker), with heavy damage in both scenes, intact rupture discs, and non-lethal shrapnel injuries consistent with the reports. Adam and Jamie concluded that the higher blast pressure was survivable due to its short duration, and that factors such as the quantity and placement of the explosive would have had the main effect on its lethality.

=== Slap Some Sense ===
Myth statement	Status	Notes
It is possible to bring an impaired/shocked person back to some degree of proper mental functioning by slapping him or her in the face.	Confirmed	As Kari consulted a military emergency physician to learn about the fight-or-flight reflex, which can be triggered by sudden trauma, Grant and Tory built a face-slapping rig to deliver a controlled amount of force. Grant was first to take a series of four tests covering reflexes, calculation, coordination, and visual/communication skills. The tests were conducted under three conditions: "normal", "impaired" (sitting in a truck full of ice blocks for 30 minutes before each test), and "impaired" followed by a slap before each test. Grant's "impaired/slapped" results were not as good as his "normal" baseline, but they were markedly better than his "impaired" scores. For a different test of judgment and coordination, Kari and Tory did an exercise on a shooting range and added more impairments: going without food or sleep for an entire day, then sitting in the ice for 30 minutes and being slapped. Their results followed the same trend as Grant's, leading the Build Team to declare the myth confirmed.
