= Jim Leonard (photographer) =

American storm chaser and photographer

James M. Leonard
- Born: February 17, 1950; Miami Beach, Florida, U.S.
- Died: November 3, 2014 (aged 64); West Palm Beach, Florida, U.S.
- Known for: Early hurricane and tornado chaser and photographer
- Website: cyclonejim.com

James M. Leonard (February 17, 1950 ‒ November 3, 2014), also known as "Cyclone Jim", was an American professional storm chaser, photographer, and videographer. Intercepting severe weather including thunderstorms, tornadoes, hurricanes and typhoons, he was among the earliest storm chasers. He was the first to photograph an anticyclonic tornado.

Leonard was the son of Arthur H. Leonard Jr. and Marjorie Irene Leonard. He grew up in south Florida and in 1971 began chasing tropical cyclones in the United States and the Caribbean, as well as on Guam and Hawaii. He sometimes moved to Guam during typhoon season. He was considered a pre-eminent tropical cyclone chaser. Leonard began chasing thunderstorms in 1974 and traveled across the Great Plains as well as locally in Florida where sea breeze interactions and waterspouts are common in summer. He sometimes moved to Oklahoma during supercell season in Tornado Alley. Leonard's photographs, films and videos have been licensed widely and featured prominently around the world. He was featured in numerous television documentaries explaining hurricanes and magazine articles. He was a contributor to Storm Track magazine and his photographs appeared frequently in Weatherwise and other publications. Leonard was also an early and respected storm chasing tour guide, working with Charles Edwards for Cloud 9 Tours, where George Kourounis and Mike Theiss also are guides. James died of cancer on November 3, 2014.

== See also ==
- Timothy P. Marshall
- Martin Lisius
- Tim Samaras
- Sean Casey
