= Tornado Chasers (TV series) =

- Season 2 title screen of Tornado Chasers
- Genre: Documentary; Weather
- Starring: Reed Timmer; Sean Schofer; Dick McGowan; Chris Chittick; Terry Rosema; Joel Taylor; Mike Scantlin; Jim Cantore; Ginger Zee; Mike Morgan
- Opening theme: "Tornado Chasers Theme"
- Composer: Jay Galvin
- Country of origin: United States
- Original language: English
- No. of seasons: 2 + Special season
- No. of episodes: 24 + 7 specials

Production
- Executive producers: Ken Cole; Chris Whiteneck
- Producers: Ken Cole; Chris Whiteneck; Jason Bagby
- Production locations: Oklahoma City, Oklahoma
- Cinematography: Chris Whiteneck
- Running time: 20–28 minutes
- Production companies: TVN LLC; Angry Sky Entertainment; Hallmark Home Entertainment

Original release
- Release: September 21, 2012 – May 4, 2014

Related
- Storm Chasers

Tornado Chasers is an American documentary series that premiered on September 19, 2012, on TVNweather.com. The program follows Reed Timmer and his team of storm chasers as they attempt to intercept tornadoes in Tornado Alley in the United States and Canada. Season 2, funded largely through a successful Kickstarter campaign, commenced on September 30, 2013. The series is a two-time Webby Award Honoree, once for Best Documentary Series in 2013, and again for Best Editing ("Home, Part 2") in 2014.

== Overview ==
Tornado Chasers was filmed each year during storm season in Tornado Alley, using Timmer's Norman, Oklahoma, home as a base. Contrary to previous series about storm chasing, Tornado Chasers takes a more personal approach, conveying the chronological, authentic storm chasing experience. During the 2012 season, Timmer's team mainly consisted of Dick McGowan, Chris Chittick, and Terry Rosema. For the 2013 season, Timmer reconnected with Joel Taylor, joined the KFOR-TV NewsChannel 4 Oklahoma City severe weather team, and welcomed broadcast meteorologists Jim Cantore and Ginger Zee as guest chase partners. He also introduced the new Dominator 3, the largest of his armored intercept vehicles.

=== Dedications ===
The episode titled "Home, Part 2" which debuted on December 5, 2013, ends with a dedication to all who lost their lives in the Moore, OK tornado of May 20, 2013. The season 2 finale titled "Nemesis, Part 2" which debuted on January 23, 2014, ends with a dedication to Tim Samaras, Paul Samaras, Carl Young, all of team TWISTEX, as well as amateur chaser Richard Henderson, all who lost their lives in the El Reno, OK tornado of May 31, 2013.

== Episodes ==
=== Season 1 (2012) ===
During the 2012 season, which consisted of 12 episodes, Timmer continues chasing during the year following the final season of Discovery's Storm Chasers. Joel Taylor left the team. Team members for the 2012 season included Dick McGowan (Dominator driver), Mike Scantlin (driver/shooter), and Chris Chittick (shooter).

No. overall	No. in season	Title	Original release date
1	1	"Grass Roots"	September 19, 2012
Tornado season begins and Reed Timmer starts off the year with two new team members, both of whom have their own opinions on where to chase. Featuring the November 7th, 2011, Tipton, Oklahoma, intercept of a violent EF4 tornado.
2	2	"The Breakup"	September 26, 2012
After a recent break up Reed finds himself chasing one last time with Ginger in hopes of gaining exposure for his grass roots operation through her reporting. In the end a nighttime tornado bears down on San Antonio, Texas, illuminated by lightning and power flashes.
3	3	"Outbreak"	October 3, 2012
Reed takes a break from his dissertation and joins the team in battling their way through a line of chasers to get close to a stovepipe tornado on April 14th, just outside Hesston, Kansas.
4	4	"Ole Blue"	October 10, 2012
Tired from working on his dissertation, Reed struggles to stay awake at a celebrity signing event so he can get back to chase in Ole Blue.
5	5	"Chapter 5"	October 17, 2012
Reed finally finishes chapter five of his dissertation and goes sleeveless in the Dominator to celebrate.
6	6	"The Grind"	October 24, 2012
Reed and the team have been grinding hard this season and it's going to take more than a little ground circulation to boost morale.
7	7	"Rocket Time"	November 7, 2012
Reed teams up with an old friend and implements his first science mission of the year.
8	8	"Intercept"	November 14, 2012
After throwing out the first pitch at a Kansas City Royals game, Reed leads his team to victory.
9	9	"Birthday Boy"	November 28, 2012
After chasing and celebrating a birthday week on the road, Reed Timmer and the boys revisit Wadena, Minnesota, which was hit by a violent tornado two years prior.
10	10	"Quadcopter"	December 5, 2012
The team encounters tornado spin-ups and record-sized hail before Reed launches his new Quadcopter probe into a storm. Reed also revisits the massive 2011 Canton, OK tornado.
11	11	"Suction Vortices"	December 19, 2012
TVN intercepts multiple vortices on foot in Wyoming.
12	12	"Stove Pipe"	January 2, 2013
Storm season comes to a thrilling conclusion when Reed Timmer and the boys scrape together what's left of the crew and head north with limited funds. Featuring the tornado in Fall River County, South Dakota, from June 22, 2012.

=== Season 2 (2013) ===
In late February 2013, TVN launched a Kickstarter campaign to fund a second season of Tornado Chasers. The campaign was enormously successful, almost doubling the original goal. Production commenced on April 5, 2013. This season saw the return of Joel Taylor (albeit briefly) to the team, and Reed became a field correspondent for the KFOR-TV storm team in Oklahoma City. A new Dominator vehicle, "Dominator 3," joined the fleet and featured the latest vehicle intercept technology. Jim Cantore from The Weather Channel also joined Timmer in the Dominator for some of the bigger tornado events, and Ginger Zee from ABC News joined Timmer's team for the May 20, 2013, Moore tornado event. The TVN team also runs into Tim Samaras, Paul Samaras, and Carl Young days before the multiple-vortex tornado took their lives.

No. overall	No. in season	Title	Original release date
13	1	"Liftoff"	September 30, 2013
The new chase season launches as Reed and the crew add a third Dominator to the fleet. Reed joins the KFOR weather team to bring unprecedented coverage of nature's fiercest storms to residents of Tornado Alley.
14	2	"Legends"	October 7, 2013
Jim Cantore, famed meteorologist and Reed's hero, arrives in Norman to chase in the Dominator. With severe weather in the forecast, Reed connects with his team members, including a wavering Joel Taylor.
15	3	"Helix"	October 14, 2013
The chase season roars to life as two Kickstarter backers, Ray and Bill, join the TVN team. Reed and his crew observe a rare and dramatic tornado, along with the destruction it leaves behind.
16	4	"Payback"	October 21, 2013
After Reed's success the day before, Dick abandons the TVN team and goes rogue. With an outbreak brewing in Kansas, Reed makes a risky move to chase in Oklahoma.
17	5	"Warning, Part 1"	November 4, 2013
With twisters targeting the OKC metro area, Jim Cantore joins forces with Reed to provide real-time warnings. A breakneck chase through the populated city of Edmond leads to the team's first intercept in Dominator 3.
18	6	"Warning, Part 2"	November 12, 2013
The unrelenting chase continues as Reed, Jim Cantore, and the team intercept another tornado before it grows into a mile-wide wedge. Coming upon storm damage, they perform search and rescue as a new tornado forms near Shawnee, Oklahoma.
19	7	"Home, Part 1"	November 25, 2013
Reed's tornado intercepts gain national attention as the TVN team gears up for a stronger round of severe weather. Ginger Zee joins Reed and Jim Cantore for a chase day that threatens the city of Moore, Oklahoma.
20	8	"Home, Part 2"	December 5, 2013
A devastating tornado tracks through Moore, OK, very close to Reed's house. Reed and the team, along with Jim Cantore and Ginger Zee, must decide whether to continue chasing or return to Moore.
21	9	"Stranded"	December 20, 2013
Reed and the team journey north to Kansas and come face-to-face with a mile-wide wedge. The storm turns the roads to mud and traps the Dominator in the tornado's path.
22	10	"Overtaken"	January 2, 2014
With 'Dominator 2' in rough shape from the previous day's intercept, a new tornado threat looms over Bennington, Kansas. Reed pushes his science mission to the limit as a massive wedge engulfs him and his team.
23	11	"Nemesis, Part 1"	January 17, 2014
A potentially catastrophic tornado day threatens central Oklahoma. Upon reaching El Reno, Reed and the team witness the birth of a multiple-vortex tornado, which would become the widest tornado in history.
24	12	"Nemesis, Part 2"	January 23, 2014
Reed's team pursues the El Reno wedge as it grows into the widest tornado in history. After the Dominator's hood gets ripped off, Reed helps The Weather Channel's Mike Bettes whose vehicle was crushed by the tornado.

=== Season 2: Ultimate Tornadoes (2014) ===
After the completion of the second season, seven supplemental episodes were produced. These episodes featured extensive content, such as an extended "tornado cut" of the season, behind the scenes, and educational material. These episodes premiered on February 18, 2014.

No. overall	No. in season	Title	Original release date
25	1	"Tornadoes of 2013: The Ultimate Cut"	February 18, 2014
Experience the epic tornadoes of Tornado Chasers 2013 from every angle. Shot by professional videographers, up to 14 HD and cinema cameras are rolling simultaneously to give you the best view. With over 80 minutes of heart-pounding footage, you will witness epic tornado events in real time, including the historic El Reno tornado.
26	2	"Tornado Chasers: Deleted Scenes"	March 4, 2014
Fifty minutes of never-before-seen moments from the 2013 season. From humor to action, this new collection of scenes gives you more adventures from every episode.
27	3	"Storm Science, Part 1: Forecasting and Chasing"	March 17, 2014
Reed explains the basics of how supercells form, how chasers forecast a tornado event, and important storm characteristics for chasing. Part one of a two-part educational series.
28	4	"Storm Science, Part 2: Experiments and Safety"	April 1, 2014
Reed explores the challenges of data collection, how to stay safe during a tornado, and common misconceptions about storm chasing. Part two of a two-part educational series.
29	5	"Dominator Tech"	May 1, 2014
Join Dominator engineer Kevin Barton as he takes you on a detailed tour of Reed Timmer's armored storm chasing vehicles. Includes a special look at the new 'Dominator 3'.
30	6	"Behind the Scenes Part 1"	May 1, 2014
Experience the making of Tornado Chasers from conception to production. In this first part, learn about the challenges of logistics, Joel Taylor's role, and more. Includes never-before-seen footage.
31	7	"Behind the Scenes Part 2"	May 3, 2014
Experience the making of Tornado Chasers from chasing to post-production. In this second part, learn about personal stories of the crew, editing, music and more. Includes never-before-seen footage.

== Release ==
The entire Tornado Chasers series is available from TVN On-Demand. Season 2 is also available on Hulu and Amazon Prime. The second season is also available on Blu-ray.

An ebook titled The Making of Tornado Chasers: Behind the Scenes of the Groundbreaking Documentary Series was released on August 20, 2014. It was written by executive producer Ken Cole, along with a foreword by Reed Timmer, and features journal-style remembrances from the production.
