= Maria Molina =

American meteorologist

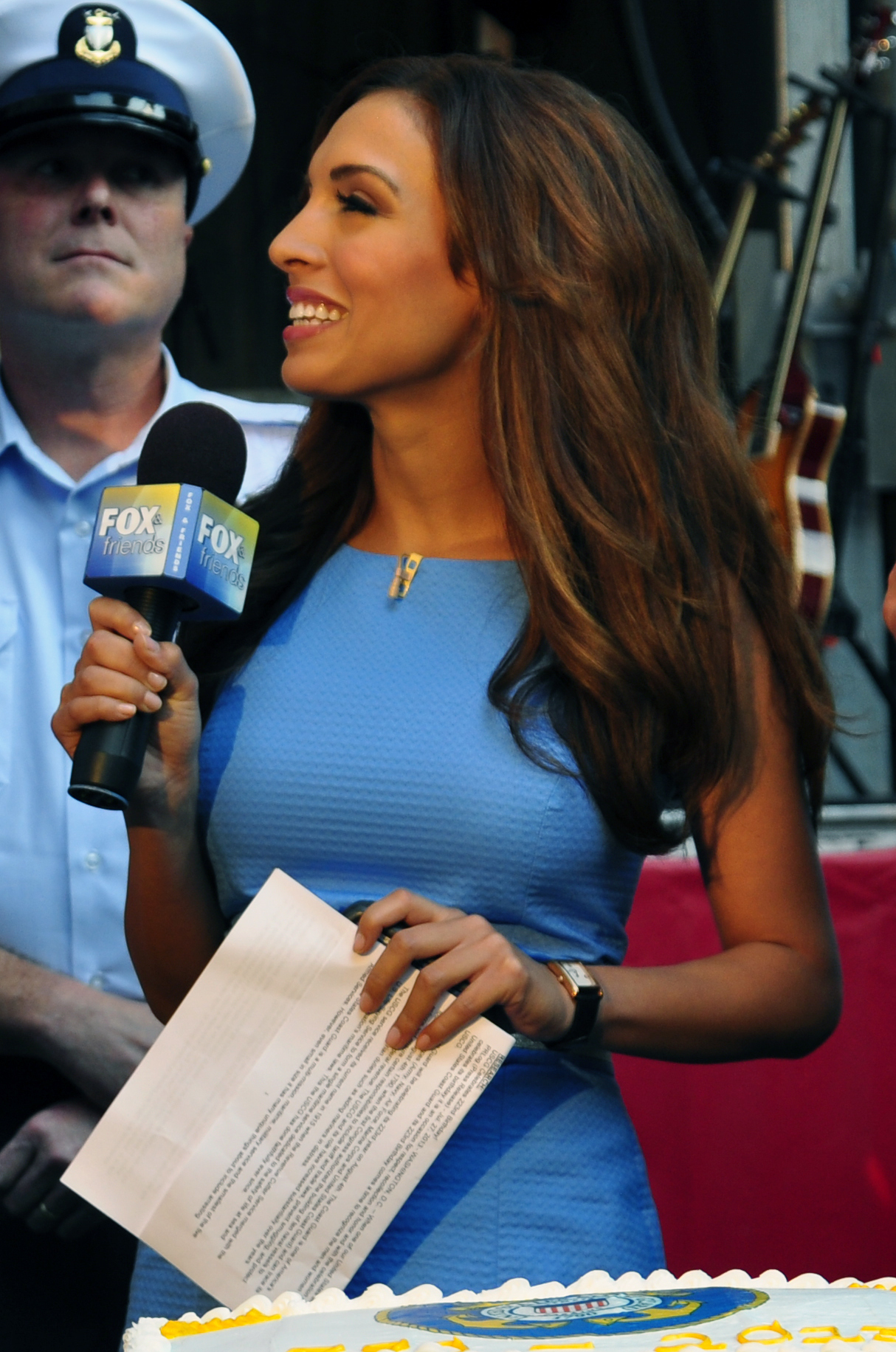
- Molina in 2013
- Born: María Janeth Molina; April 7, 1987 (age 39); Nicaragua
- Education: Meteorology
- Alma mater: Florida State University (BS) Columbia University (MA) Central Michigan University (PhD)
- Occupation: Meteorologist
- Spouse: Reed Timmer (m. 2015; div. 2017)

Maria Janeth Molina (born April 7, 1987) is an American meteorologist. She was the on-air meteorologist for the Fox News Channel, a U.S. television network, from 2010 to 2016. As of 2022 she is an assistant professor in the Department of Atmospheric and Oceanic Science at the University of Maryland, College Park.

== Early life ==
Molina was born in Nicaragua and grew up in Hialeah, Florida. She is a graduate of Barbara Goleman Senior High School. She attributes her interest in meteorology to her experience with Category 5 Hurricane Andrew, which hit her hometown in South Florida when she was 5 years old.'

== Education ==
Molina graduated cum laude from Florida State University in 2008, where she earned a Bachelor of Science degree in meteorology and minors in mathematics and communications. While at Florida State University, she completed the University Honors Program and the Honors in the Major Program requirements.

Additionally, she graduated from Columbia University in the City of New York in 2015 with a Masters of Arts degree in Climate and Society.

She earned her PhD from Central Michigan University in the Earth and Ecosystem Science Doctoral Program, where she was also a graduate research assistant.

== Career ==
Molina has earned the Certified Broadcast Meteorologist (CBM) designation from the American Meteorological Society (AMS).

Molina joined Fox News in October 2010. She provided weather updates on many Fox shows and appeared regularly on the FOX & Friends morning show, until leaving the station for graduate school in September 2016. She was credited as being the youngest meteorologist on cable in 2012. While at Fox News, she also appeared on the Fox Business, Fox News Radio, Fox News Latino, and Fox Sports Networks.

She served as a part-time meteorologist at WJBK Fox2 in Detroit mainly on weekend newscasts while pursuing her doctoral degree in Michigan.

Prior to Fox News, Molina was a bilingual TV meteorologist for AccuWeather in State College, Pennsylvania, for which she provided weather forecasts in both English and Spanish.

She was an Advanced Study Program (ASP) postdoctoral fellow at the National Center for Atmospheric Research.

== Personal life ==
In December 2015, she married storm chaser Reed Timmer at the Masaya Volcano National Park in Nicaragua but the two would end up divorcing in 2017 according to Reed.
