= Reed Timmer =

American meteorologist and storm chaser (born 1980)

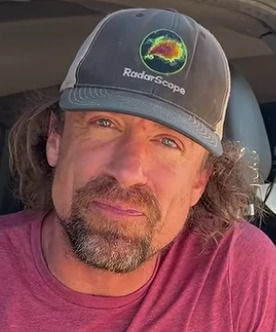
- Timmer in 2026
- Born: March 17, 1980 (age 46); Grand Rapids, Michigan, United States
- Education: University of Oklahoma (Ph.D.)
- Known for: Prolific storm chaser, featured on Storm Chasers
- Spouse: Maria Molina (m. 2015; div. 2017)
- Scientific career
- Fields: Meteorology
- Workplaces: AccuWeather; KFOR-TV
- Doctoral advisor: Peter Lamb; Lance Leslie; Michael Richman
- Website: https://www.teamdominator.com/

Reed Timmer (born March 17, 1980) is an American meteorologist, storm chaser, and television personality. Born in Grand Rapids, Michigan, he took an interest in science, including weather, at a young age, before experiencing severe weather, including a hailstorm at age 13. After presenting weather forecasts at his high school, he began studying meteorology at the University of Oklahoma, completing his PhD in 2015.

During his storm chasing career, Timmer filmed his first tornado in 1998 in Oklahoma before taking part in numerous chases of tornadoes. Timmer then observed the 1999 Bridge Creek–Moore tornado, a year after his first tornado filmed; the 2011 Philadelphia, Mississippi and Tuscaloosa–Birmingham tornadoes, which were included in the 2011 Super Outbreak; and the 2013 El Reno tornado, an EF3 tornado which he was injured in. In 2022, he chased and filmed the eyewall of Category 5 Hurricane Ian.

Timmer is known for starring in the Discovery Channel reality television series Storm Chasers, as well as in the documentary film Tornado Glory and in the television series Tornado Chasers. He later appeared as a guest star in Jay Leno's Garage in an episode, and Storm Rising as himself with Mike Theiss, another storm chaser. Timmer also appeared in a 2010 episode of Mythbusters, alongside Sean Casey, where they showcased the performance of their storm chasing vehicles (Dominator 1, and TIV 2) against EF5-level tornado winds.

== Early life ==
Timmer was born on March 17, 1980, in Grand Rapids, Michigan. He has an older and younger sister, and his parents divorced when he was 10 years old. He developed an interest in science from a young age, partly because his mother was a middle school science teacher. Fascinated by subjects like insects and weather, he was often bullied for his passion. He also played the oboe, which he had a music scholarship in, and watched The Weather Channel continuously.

Timmer's first experience with storms was at the age of 5, during a tornado-warned storm which he described as chaotic while also being "scared to death", in part of his fear of thunder and lightning. He also experienced a hailstorm at the age of 13, which he called his "first storm chase", and resulted in his family's video camera being destroyed after attempting to capture it. Timmer presented weather forecasts at his high school in Grand Rapids, Forest Hills Central, while also participating in the Science Olympiad competition in both middle school and high school. He also became an Eagle Scout in 1995, the highest rank of a Boy Scout.

In 1998, after graduating from his high school, Timmer began studying meteorology at the University of Oklahoma (OU). He completed his PhD in 2015, at the age of 35.

== Storm chasing career ==
Timmer frequently drives more than 50,000 miles (80,000 km) a year to intercept severe thunderstorms.

=== 1998–2010: First filmed tornado, Dominator 1 ===
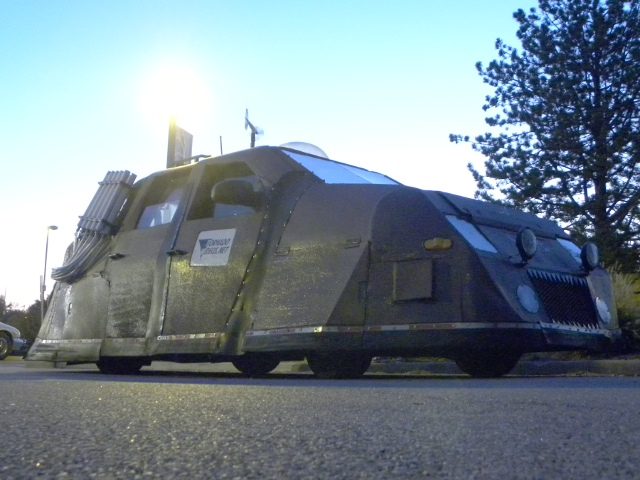
The SRV Dominator 1, pictured in 2010

On October 4, 1998, Timmer filmed his first tornado in Perry, Oklahoma, which he recalled that the tornado "didn't feel like it could kill me, but I was mesmerized". While as a freshman at the University of Oklahoma, Timmer began storm chasing on May 3, 1999, where he encountered the Bridge Creek–Moore tornado, forcing him and three friends to take shelter under a highway overpass. The F5 tornado was ultimately recorded as one of the strongest tornadoes ever, with Timmer characterizing it as "overwhelming".

In 2003, Timmer intercepted an F4 tornado in South Dakota, associated with a larger statewide tornado outbreak, that directly impacted Manchester, South Dakota. While chasing a tornado a year later, the vehicle he was in lost control on an unpaved road and crashed into a sewage ditch, destroying his computer equipment, which was uninsured. In 2005, Timmer both chased a tornado east of Madelia, Minnesota, and Hurricane Katrina, with the latter event's flooding and storm surge he described as "intimidating".

Timmer starred in the documentary film Tornado Glory in 2006, along with Joel Taylor, who was another Oklahoma University meteorology student and storm chaser who was Timmer's friend. Soon after, Timmer constructed the Dominator 1, as part of the SRV Dominator series, which was modified from a 2007 Chevrolet Tahoe for use in the TV series Storm Chasers beginning in October 2007. He also starred in the aforementioned television series, continuing into the next season of it as well.

On June 5, 2009, Timmer filmed inside a tornado near LaGrange, Wyoming in Dominator 1, also recording a wind speed of 155.2 miles per hour (249.8 km/h). He then chased an EF2 tornado near Aurora, Nebraska twelve days later, where a vortex inside the tornado blew out a window of the vehicle he was in, resulting in Timmer and photographer Chris Chittick suffering lacerations to his face. Additionally, he recorded a wind speed of 138.8 miles per hour (223.4 km/h), and the tornado, along with Timmer's chase, were included in a Storm Chasers episode.

Timmer chased an EF4 tornado that struck Yazoo City, Mississippi on April 24, 2010, where he and Joel Taylor conducted efforts to rescue victims in the aftermath of the tornado. He later stated that it was "definitely one of the biggest tornadoes I've ever seen". In the same year, he and Andrew Tilin wrote a book titled Into the Storm, which details Timmer's storm chasing experiences. Timmer also appeared in a 2010 episode of Mythbusters, alongside Sean Casey, where they showcased the performance of their storm chasing vehicles (Dominator 1, and TIV) against EF5-level tornado winds.

=== 2011–2018: Super Outbreak, cancellation of Storm Chasers, death of Joel Taylor ===
On April 27, 2011, during the 2011 Super Outbreak, Timmer observed four destructive wedge tornadoes across eastern Mississippi and Alabama, including tornadoes that impacted Philadelphia, Mississippi and Tuscaloosa–Birmingham. At the time, Timmer stated that the severe weather event was "hands down the most unforgettable day", while also describing the amount of tornadoes as "heartbreaking" and "overwhelming". The severe weather event was premiered as an episode as part of Storm Chasers, titled "Tornado Rampage 2011". In the same year, Timmer built the heavily armored Dominator 2, modifying it from a GMC Yukon XL.

Following declining ratings, Storm Chasers, the television series that Timmer starred in, was cancelled in 2012. In the television series, Timmer also followed severe weather with his TornadoVideos.net team in a SRV Dominator vehicle, the team of which consisted of Timmer, photographer Chris Chittick, and driver Joel Taylor. After the cancellation of Storm Chasers, Timmer then starred in another television series, Tornado Chasers. Timmer would then intercept the Arnett–Woodward, Oklahoma tornado which would ultimately result in six deaths and 28 injuries.

A year later, in 2013, Timmer chased an erratic-moving EF3 tornado near Bennington, Kansas, which he recalled as "probably the most powerful, most intimidating tornado that I've ever chased". Three days later, Timmer was injured after chasing the 2013 El Reno tornado for KFOR-TV, which ultimately killed 3 professional and 1 non-experienced storm chaser, including Tim Samaras. While chasing a tornado outbreak associated with the October 2013 North American storm complex in Nebraska, Timmer was hospitalized after suffering a seizure as part of the KFOR-TV weather team. According to Timmer, it was his second seizure.

In the same year, Timmer constructed a third vehicle, the Dominator 3, modifying it from a 2013 Ford F-350 Super Duty pickup truck and weighing 11,000 pounds (5,000 kg). He chased his first tornadoes inside the Dominator 3 near Shawnee, Oklahoma in May that year. Additionally, in 2013, he became a storm chaser for KFOR-TV's 4WARN Storm Team, with his SRV Dominator 2 as 4WARN Dominator 4.

In 2015, Timmer chased an EF2 tornado, with his mother, as part of a Mother's Day gift. In 2016, Timmer filmed a photogenic EF2 tornado near Wray, Colorado on May 7, that went viral, garnering nearly 43 million views as of May 2021. In November, Timmer joined AccuWeather, covering severe weather until 2019. A year later, on May 16, 2017, Timmer deployed a weather probe inside an EF2 tornado southwest of Elk City, Oklahoma, which recorded a 360-degree video that received praise from AccuWeather affiliates.

On January 23, 2018, Joel Taylor, one of Timmer's friends and the driver of the SRV Dominator vehicles, died from a drug overdose while on a cruise ship in San Juan, Puerto Rico. As a result, Timmer stated that he was "shocked and absolutely devastated by the loss of my incredible, caring friend", while also reporting his death. That same year, Timmer chased several natural disasters, including Hurricane Michael and a tornado in Federal, Wyoming, the latter event of which he recalled seeing "cows flying through the air".

=== 2019–present: Departure from AccuWeather, Hurricane Ian ===
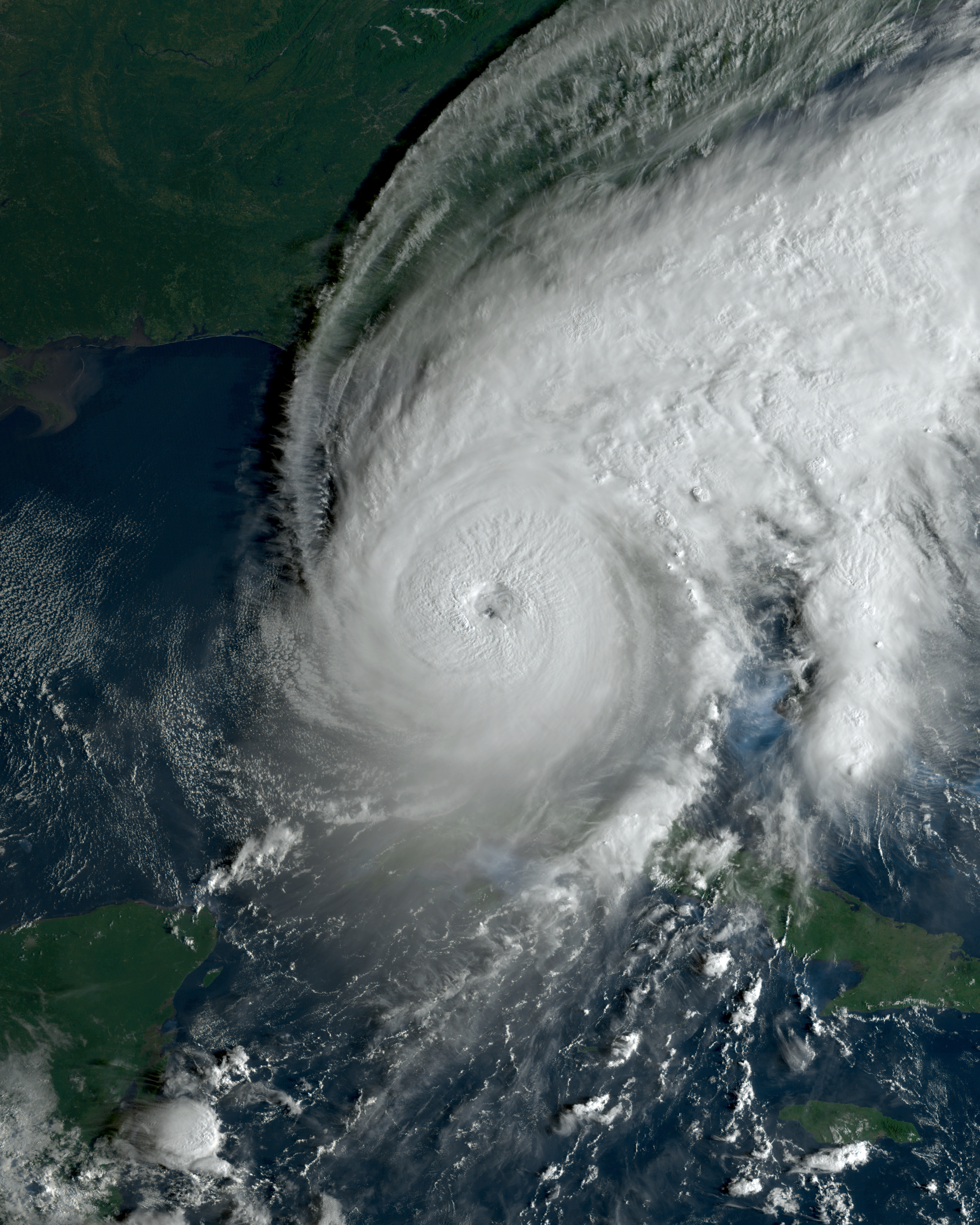
Hurricane Ian at peak intensity while approaching southwestern Florida on September 28, 2022. Timmer was positioned on Pine Island during Ian's landfall.

Timmer, in the Dominator 3, chased an EF2 tornado in McCook, Nebraska on May 17, 2019, which covered his face with field manure as he encountered near-zero visibility. In the same month, Timmer launched a rocket probe, designed by a colleague, into an EF4 tornado on May 28 near Lawrence, Kansas to collect data of the tornado-producing supercell and the tornado itself, which he called "incredible". After his tenure with AccuWeather ended in 2019, Timmer became a content creator for weather forecasts and storm chasing on social media, including Twitter, where he created the popularized term "gorilla hail" on April 13, 2021, after experiencing large hail.

In 2020, Timmer and Mike Theiss, another storm chaser, took part in the National Geographic television show Category 6. A year later, in 2021, they both starred in Storm Rising, a documentary television series.

In 2022, while inside the eyewall of Hurricane Ian, Timmer filmed videos of the storm surge on Pine Island, which significantly damaged his vehicle, Dominator Fore, a modified 2018 Subaru Forester. After the Category 5 hurricane, he was stranded on the island after the bridge connecting Pine Island to mainland Florida was impassable.

On March 24, 2023, Timmer chased a supercell in western Mississippi that would produce the Rolling Fork–Silver City tornado. After the tornado struck Rolling Fork at EF4 intensity, Timmer and other storm chasers began their search-and-rescue efforts that would result in Timmer himself transporting two people to hospitals.

In 2025, Timmer announced his "Dominate the Storm" tour, with shows in numerous states. On October 10, Tampa, Florida-based YouTuber MoistCr1tikal was sued by a law firm representing Timmer and fellow storm chaser Brad Arnold for viewing parts of their livestreams of Hurricane Milton during his own livestream about the storm. Timmer later stated that MoistCr1tikal had inadvertently been caught up in a larger "campaign against content theft and social media", and removed himself from the lawsuit, requesting that MoistCr1tikal "ask for permission" for any future uses of his content.

== Personal life ==
In December 2015, Timmer married meteorologist Maria Molina at the Masaya Volcano National Park in Nicaragua but the two ended up divorcing in 2017 according to Reed.

Timmer resides in Golden, Colorado, after having previously resided in Norman, Oklahoma. He had a dog named Gizmo who often accompanied him on chases. Gizmo died at the age of 17 on August 5, 2025.

== Filmography ==
Year	Title	Role	Notes	Refs.
2006	Tornado Glory	Himself		
2007–2012	Storm Chasers	Himself		
2010	MythBusters	Himself		
2012	Tornado Chasers	Himself		
2019	Jay Leno's Garage	Guest star	Episode: "Tough Enough"	
2021	Storm Rising	Himself		
2026	In the Eye of the Storm: Chasers	Himself		

== See also ==
- Mike Bettes
- Mark Robinson (meteorologist)
- History of tornado research
  - Research on tornadoes in 2024
