= Mike Theiss =

American storm chaser (born 1978)

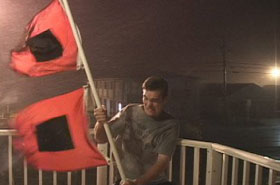
- Born: April 22, 1978 (age 48); Key Largo, Florida, United States
- Occupations: Photographer, adventurer, storm chaser
- Website: extremenature.com

Mike Theiss (born April 22, 1978) is a National Geographic photographer, on air talent, video producer, professional storm chaser. He is the CEO/Founder of Ultimate Chase Inc. that specializes in extreme nature photography. His work has been published in National Geographic magazine numerous times for displaying hurricanes, tornadoes, lightning, volcanoes, and other rare nature events.

== Career ==
Theiss started storm chasing in 1986 in Key Largo, Florida, and now chases worldwide.

In 2004, Theiss captured one of the highest wind gusts ever recorded on video inside Hurricane Charley with an estimated wind gust over 155 mph in Charlotte Harbor, Florida.

The National Hurricane Center (NHC) used his barometric pressure reading of 942 mb (hPa) inside Hurricane Charley's eye in their final report as the official lowest pressure recorded by a handheld barometer during Charley.

In 2005, Theiss captured the highest storm surge on video during Hurricane Katrina in Gulfport, Mississippi. This video premiered exclusively on NBC's Today Show where Matt Lauer dubbed Theiss' video as the "scariest video" to come out of Katrina. This video is being considered for Guinness World Records for the highest storm surge ever caught on camera. Theiss is the co-author of the Amazon "best selling" book titled Hurricane Katrina "Through the eyes of Storm Chasers". A photo of Theiss holding on to a sign in Hurricane Katrina's storm surge debuted on the front cover of National Geographic's Witness to Disaster book.

In 2006, Theiss was nominated for an Emmy and won an award from (PDN) Photo District News and (NPPA) National Press Photographers Association for best news coverage of the year. Theiss has documented 25 hurricanes in the United States, the Caribbean, and Mexico, including Hurricane Katrina, Hurricane Charley, Hurricane Rita, Hurricane Ivan, Hurricane Wilma, and Hurricane Andrew. From 2006 to 2009 Mike was a sponsored blog writer for Weather Underground blogging about Hurricane Adventure and Tornado Encounters. Theiss makes regular appearances on The Weather Channel doing television and phone interviews while inside landfalling hurricanes. Theiss' video has been seen worldwide in over 65 television documentaries and news specials.

Theiss is also a speaker at the Annenberg Space for Photography in Los Angeles, discussing his near-death experiences.

In 2012, Theiss was hired by BBC (CBBC) to be a television presenter for the new kids weather series entitled Fierce Earth. He and other presenters take one on a journey around the world to find mother natures most extreme weather situations.

Theiss chases severe thunderstorms and tornadoes in the Great Plains. He operates as a tour guide for Cloud 9 Tours with owner Charles Edwards. Other guides include Jim Leonard (photographer) and George Kourounis.

In 2016, Theiss became the first American news reporter to report on a land-falling hurricane in Cuba since the lifting of the 1962 travel ban between the US and Cuba. Theiss reported live on The Weather Channel while inside the eye-wall and eye of extreme Category 4 Hurricane Matthew in Baracoa, Cuba. This was the first time ever achieved in the news industry.
