= Sean Casey (filmmaker) =

American IMAX filmmaker and storm chaser

Sean Cameron Casey
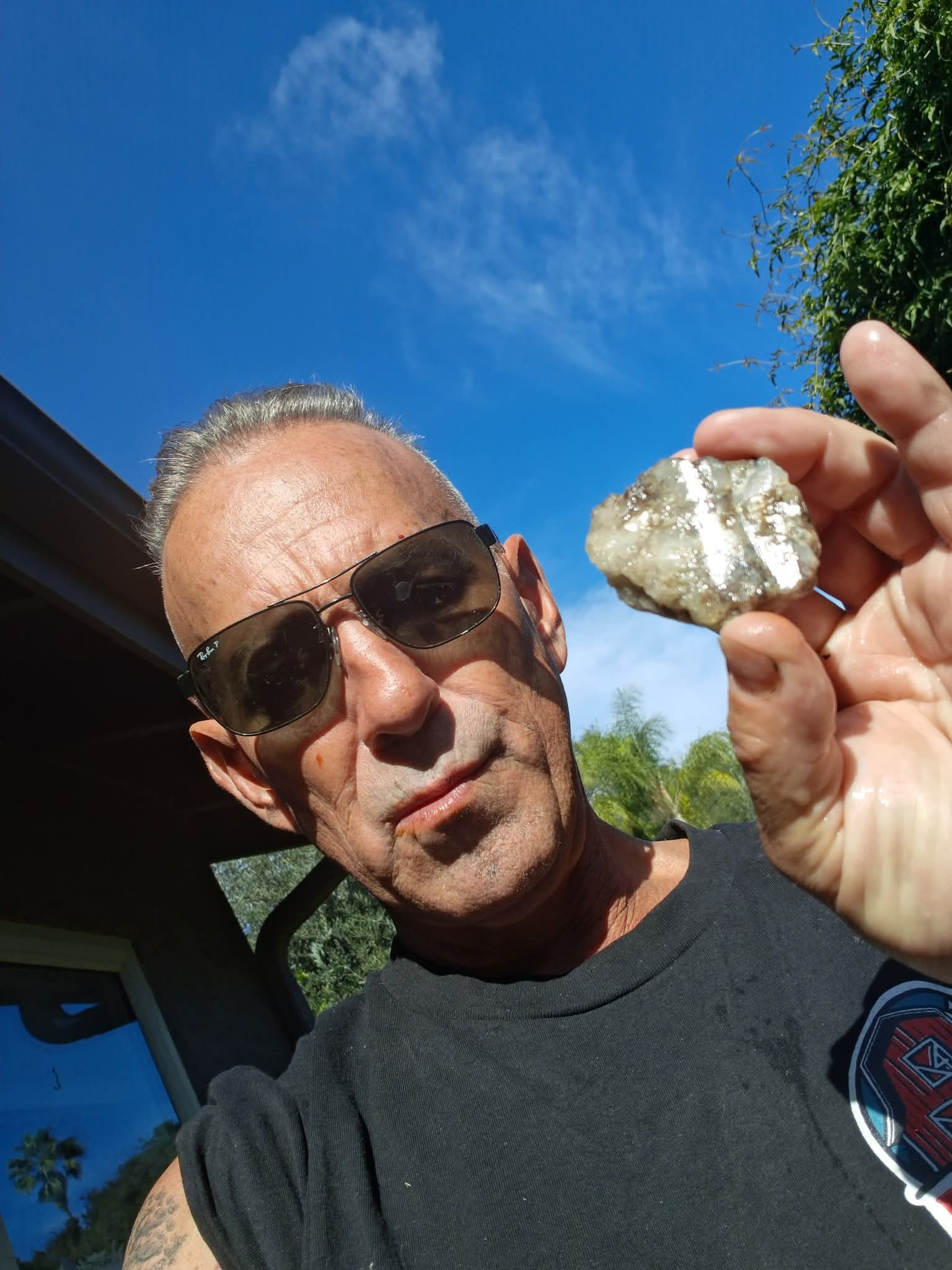
- Casey in 2025
- Born: December 28, 1967 (age 58); California, United States
- Occupation: Former IMAX filmmaker
- Years active: 1998-2019
- Known for: Featured on Storm Chasers; IMAX filmmaker Invented the Tornado Intercept Vehicles; Featured on Discover Magazine's "50 Best Minds"; Other IMAX films (Forces of Nature, Extreme Weather, Back From the Brink)
- Spouse: Jennifer Casey div.
- Children: 2

Sean Cameron Casey (born December 28, 1967) is an American IMAX filmmaker and former storm chaser who appeared in the Discovery Channel reality television series Storm Chasers and the 2005 National Geographic film Tornado Intercept. Casey created an IMAX film called Tornado Alley about chasing tornadoes and built the Tornado Intercept Vehicle (TIV) and the Tornado Intercept Vehicle 2 (TIV2) to film IMAX video inside a tornado for that film.

Tornado Alley was released worldwide on March 18, 2011. Casey has been named one of the 50 best minds of 2008 by Discover Magazine.

Casey appeared in a 2010 episode of Mythbusters, alongside Reed Timmer, where they showcased the performance of their storm chasing vehicles (Dominator 1, and TIV) against artificial EF5-level tornado winds using a retired Boeing 747.

== Tornado Intercept Vehicles ==
Casey built two mobile armored trucks called Tornado Intercept Vehicles (TIV1 and TIV2) to film very near to from inside the tornadoes he chases, sometimes with atmospheric scientist Joshua Wurman's Center for Severe Weather Research and the Doppler on Wheels radar trucks (DOW 2-DOW 7). He also made the Subanator (also known as Suba-Dominator) from a modified 4th generation 2010 Subaru Outback.

Construction began on the TIV in 2003 and cost over $80,000. Sean began the concept of the TIV after having to use rented minivans to storm chase, and being unable to get up close to a tornado. The windows are bullet resistant polycarbonate at 1.5 in (40 mm) thick. The Tornado Intercept Vehicles have a 7.3-liter Ford Power Stroke turbo diesel under the hood, and the top speed is 85 mph (137 km/h). The TIV weighs in at 8 short tons (7,300 kg) and holds 60 US gallons (230 L) of fuel. Construction began on TIV 2 in September 2007 with help from Great Plains Technology Center in Lawton, Oklahoma after Sean realized he needed to upgrade his vehicle.

TIV 2 weighs in at 7 short tons (6,400 kg) and is a 6-wheel drive, 3 axle vehicle. When it was transferred to Ryan Shepard, it was converted from 6 wheel-drive to a 6x4 4 wheel-drive system. It stands taller than the original TIV and is capable of going on mud and unpaved roads without the fear of getting stuck. The original TIV has 2-wheel drive and extremely low ground clearance that would cause it to get stuck on unpaved roads. It is powered by a 6.7-liter Cummins turbodiesel engine, modified with propane and water injection, to produce 625 horsepower. This gives TIV 2 an estimated top speed of over 110 mph (180 km/h). Fuel capacity is 95 US gallons (360 L) in a custom fuel tank, giving TIV 2 an approximate range over 750 miles (1,200 km). The body of TIV 2 is constructed of a 1/8-inch steel skin welded over a 2 in (50 mm) square tubing steel frame.

The windows in TIV2 are all bullet resistant 1 5/8 inch interlayered polycarbonate sheets and tempered glass. TIV 2 also features an IMAX filming turret similar to the one on the original TIV. The original TIV's somewhat cumbersome hydraulic claws were not used on TIV2 in favor of four hydraulic skirts that drop down to deflect wind over the TIV to stabilize it and protect the underside from debris plus two stakes that extend down 42 in (110 cm). The stakes were so effective that after the first use, TIV 2 could not retract the stakes, and they had to be dug out by hand.

As for the Subanator, he made it in 2023. Sean was spotted numerous times storm chasing during the 2023-2024 tornado season with his Subanator. Finally, on February 13, 2025, Sean sold the Subanator to a storm chaser named Chad Crilley.

== See also ==
- Tornado records
- VORTEX2
