= Doppler on Wheels =

Fleet of truck-mounted weather radars

- Flexible Array of Radars and Mesonets
- Abbreviation: FARM
- Formation: 1995; 31 years ago
- Founders: Joshua Michael Aaron Ryder Wurman
- Type: Research facility
- Legal status: Incorporated
- Purpose: Severe weather research
- Headquarters: Boulder, Colorado, United States
- Location: Boulder, Colorado, United States
- Region served: United States
- Fields: Meteorology and Radar Development
- Executive Director: Joshua Wurman
- Managing Director: Karen Kosiba
- Affiliations: University of Alabama in Huntsville Severe Weather Institute - Radar & Lightning Laboratory
- Website: www.farmfacility.org//
- Formerly called: University of Oklahoma Mobile Radar Research Lab (1995-2002), Center for Severe Weather Research (CSWR) (2003-2020)

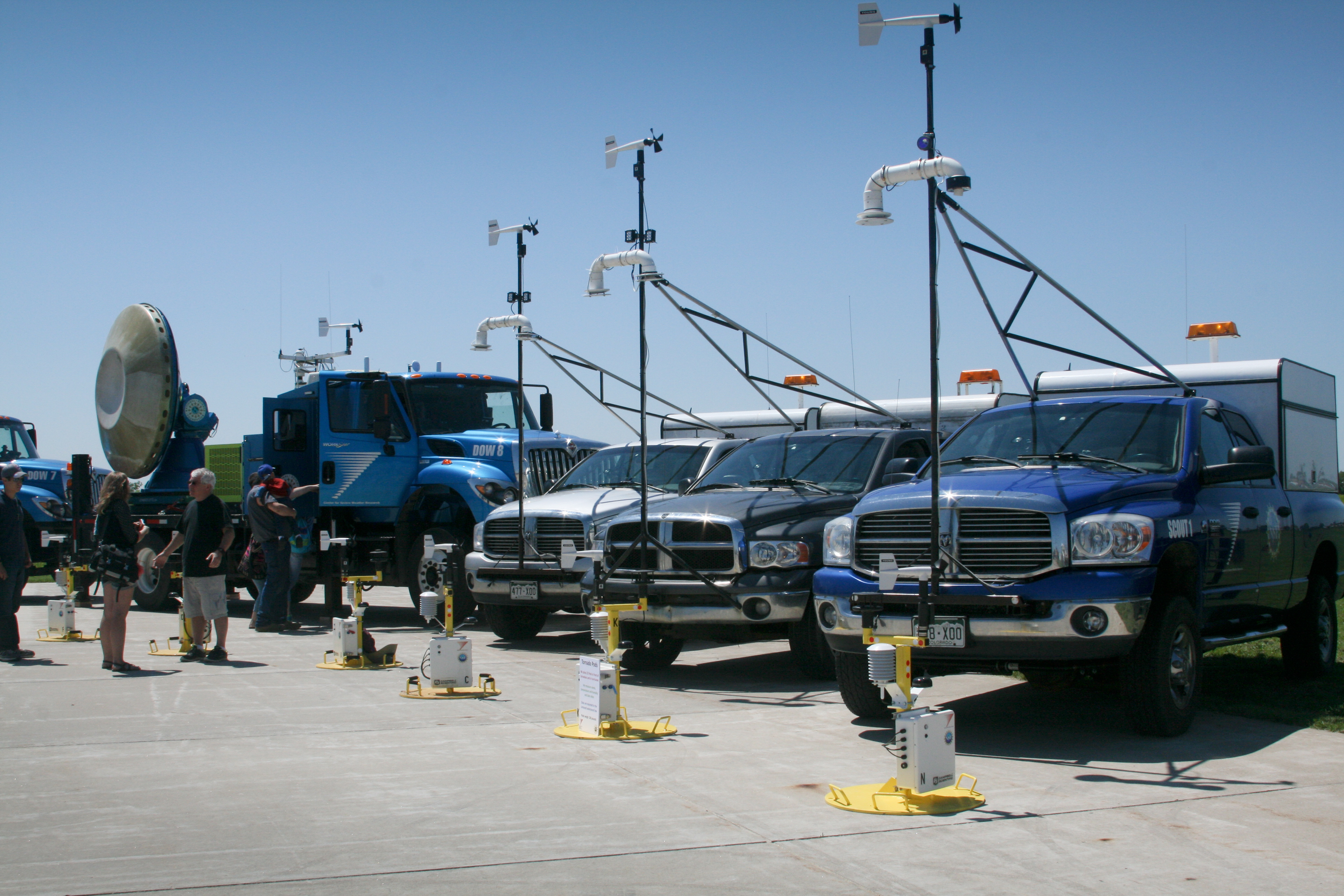
Doppler on Wheels 8, Scout vehicles, and probes during PECAN 2015 media day.

Doppler on Wheels (DOW) is a fleet of quickly deployable truck-mounted weather radars managed by FARM (Flexible Array of Radars and Mesonets), an American research company affiliated with the University of Alabama in Huntsville. The group, which started under the University of Oklahoma School of Meteorology before becoming an independent nonprofit research facility in 2003, is led by atmospheric scientists Joshua Wurman and Karen Kosiba. FARM is partially funded by the National Science Foundation as part of the "Community Instruments and Facilities" program. The DOW fleet has been used throughout the United States since 1995 and internationally since 1999 to research hazardous and challenging weather phenomena such as tornadoes, hail, and hurricanes. The name refers to the doppler weather radars mounted on the trucks, which are able to determine precipitation intensity, velocity, and direction by analyzing the frequency shifts of radar returns.

== History ==
In 1995, the University of Oklahoma's Meteorological Radar Research Laboratory completed construction of the first Doppler on Wheels 1 (DOW 1). The DOW 1 was specifically designed to be deployed rapidly in the field, allowing Wurman's crew to observe severe weather phenomena at close range. Shortly after its completion, DOW 1 was able to shortly successfully scan its first tornado. Its debut came just in time for VORTEX-95 (Verification of the Origins of Rotation in Tornadoes Experiment), where it helped predict multiple tornadoes.

By March 1998, Wurman, then head of the DOW program, submitted an incorporation request to the Oklahoma Secretary of State. The application was approved on March 24, 1998, and later revised on January 23, 2003, for approval in Colorado. This process formally established the Center for Severe Weather Research (CSWR), Incorporated, allowing it to operate independently from the University of Oklahoma. Later in 2003, Wurman left the university, reportedly citing 'hatred' towards academic politics.

By 1997, he had finally finished constructions on the second-generation DOW, named DOW 2. Like DOW 1, it used an MP-61 pedestal derived from the SCR-584 Radar. DOW 2 was deployed during VORTEX-98, where it demonstrated improved performance over DOW 1. Shortly after DOW 2 became operational, DOW 1 was decommissioned and replaced by DOW 3. DOW 1 was returned to the National Severe Storms Laboratory (NSSL) and used as a vertical atmospheric profiling radar. It remained in use until 2002, after which it was relocated to the NEXRAD Station KOUN.

DOW 2 was active from 1997 to 2002 and first being used for the Coastal Meteorology Research Program 1997 (CMRP) in Florida. In 1997, DOW 2 and DOW 3 were both able to scan tornadic supercells near Kiefer and Glenpool, Oklahoma, on May 27, 1997. By 1998, DOW 2 and DOW 3 were a part of ROTATE-98. One of ROTATE's major intercepts was the Spencer, South Dakota, F4. On the evening of May 30, 1998, a supercell in southeastern South Dakota produced a series of tornadoes that were observed by DOW 3. The DOW 3 observed the tornadoes from before 8:04 through 8:45 pm local time, including the passage of the F4 tornado through Spencer itself. Winds up to 237 mph were estimated by DOW 3.

On May 3, 1999, the DOWs achieved one of the most well-known observations. DOW 2 and DOW 3 were both on hand to observe the Bridge Creek–Moore F5 tornado for ROTATE-99, with DOW 3 being able to estimate winds up to 301mph when the tornado was passing through Bridge–Creek. That same year, DOW 2 was deployed to Switzerland for the Mesoscale Alpine Programme (MAP), studying atmospheric and hydrological processes over mountainous terrain with the goal of better understanding how complex topography impacts weather systems making it the first international deployment for CSWR.

In the 2000s, the Center for Severe Weather Research was featured on TLC in the documentary series Awesome Forces. Episode 4, titled "Tornado Chasers," focused on several storm-chasing groups, including the DOW team at the University of Oklahoma. The episode highlighted their observations of the 1998 Spencer, South Dakota tornado and the 1999 Bridge Creek–Moore tornado using DOW 3. DOW3 was also featured in the show Storm Chasers and featured on France 3 and Canal+ shortly after deployments within the Alps.

DOW 4 was completed in 2000, becoming the first Doppler on Wheels to feature dual polarization, allowing it to scan using horizontal and vertical polarizations simultaneously and thereby better differentiate between types of precipitation. Before being transferred to the National Observatory of Athens, DOW 4 participated in several U.S. research efforts, including Iowa Precipitation Experiments, the CAMEX-4 Keys Area Microphysics Project (KAMP) in early September 2001, and the International H2O Project 2002 (IHOP). IHOP ran for approximately six weeks from May 13 to June 25, 2002, over the Southern Great Plains, with scientists from Europe and the United States collaborating to improve the understanding and forecasting of convection. Cswr Following IHOP, DOW 4 was shipped to Europe, where it was transferred to the Institute of Environmental Research and Sustainable Development (IERSD) of the National Observatory of Athens, subsequently being referred to as the XPOL Mobile Weather Radar or NOA XPOL.

== Doppler on Wheels 1 ==
DOW 1
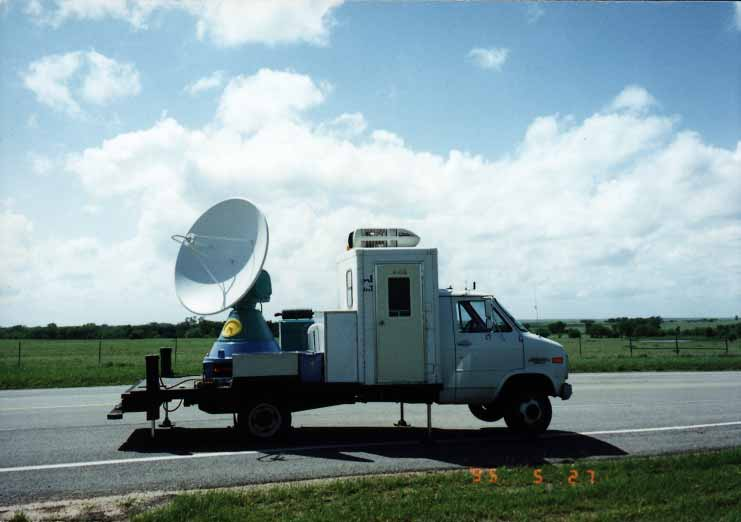
- Country of origin: USA
- Designer: Joshua Wurman
- Introduced: 1995
- No. built: 1
- Type: Weather Radar
- Frequency: X-band
- PRF: 500 - 2300 Hz
- Beamwidth: (3dB) 1.22° in 1995, decreased to 0.93° in 1996
- Pulsewidth: 0.5 - 2.0 μs
- Power: 40 kW (Peak Tx Power)
- Other names: Project Vortex - Mobile Radar No.1

The Doppler on Wheels (DOW) radar program began in 1994 with the goal of fielding a mobile, but fully capable, pencil-beam, scanning, pulsed Doppler radar, with the real-time multiparameter displays, and versatile programmable volume scanning ability typical of stationary weather research systems.

It was constructed from November 1994 to April 1995, in preparation for VORTEX-95. DOW 1 was able to be deployed for the project, and able to observe several tornadoes. DOW 1 was also used for several other research projects, including Small Cumulus Mesoscale Study (SCMS) in Florida in 1995, the FLATLAND/LIFT Boundary Layer Experiment in Illinois in 1996, and a microburst study run by MIT/LL and the FAA in 1996. DOW 1 was decommissioned in 1997, with the creation of DOW 2 and DOW 3.

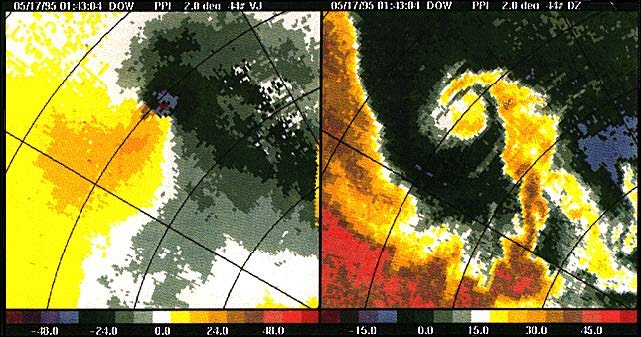
Velocity and Reflectivity scan of Hanston, KS tornado on May 16th, 1995. This is the first truck mounted mobile weather radar scan of a tornado in history.

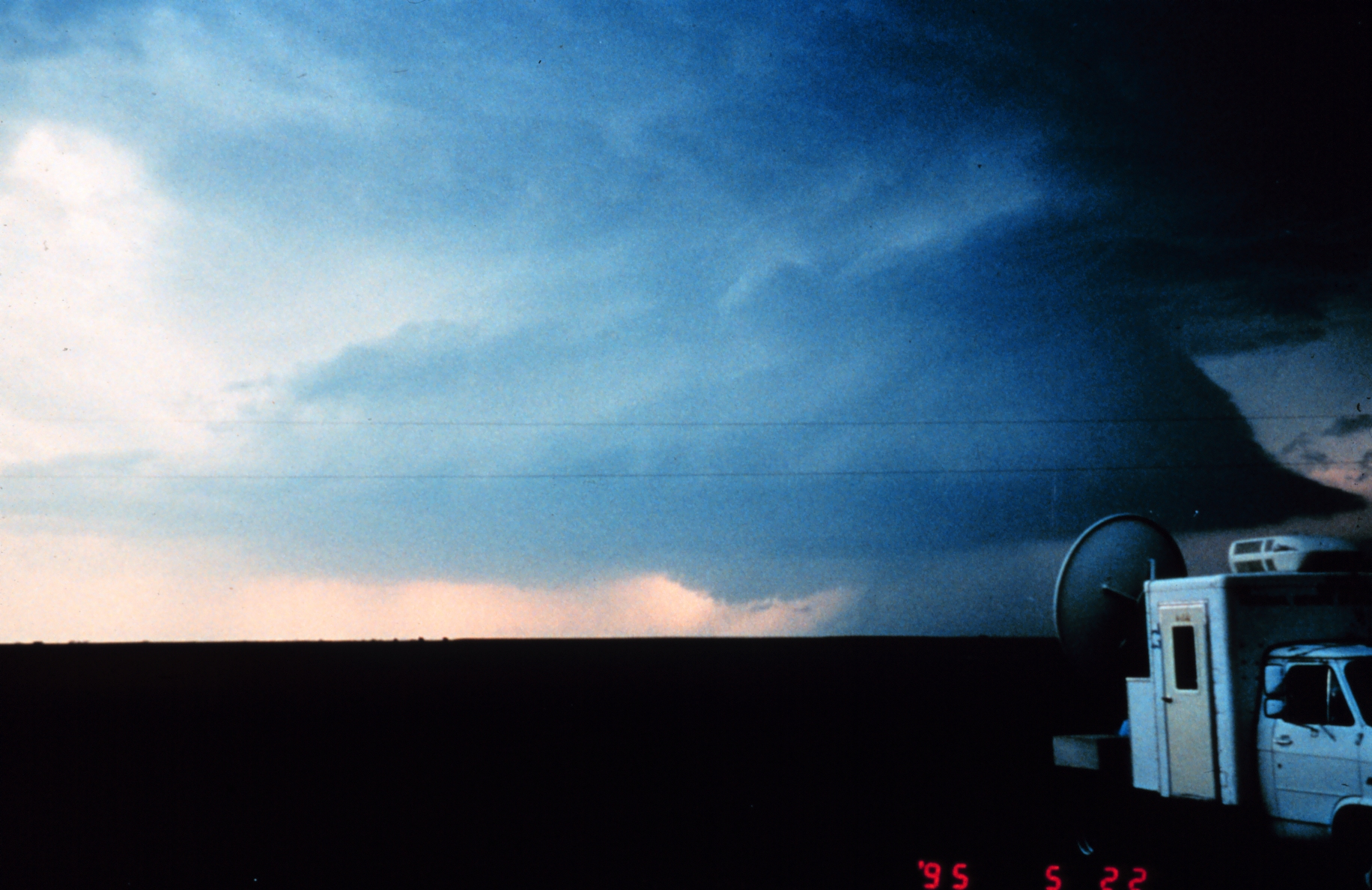
NSSL Project Vortex - Mobile Radar No.1 SE of Shamrock, Texas

DOW 1 used the transmitter of a CP-2 radar provided by the National Center for Atmospheric Research, along with a surplus antenna, pedestal, and receiver hardware. It was mounted on a modified Chevrolet G30 flatbed truck, costing roughly $50,000. In 1996, the radar was upgraded with the installation of a new 2.44 meter antenna, replacing the previous 1.88 meter antenna. The new antenna allowed for a decreased beamwidth of 0.93°, improving the radar's overall resolution. This upgraded radar would later be used by DOW 3 upon its completion in 1997.

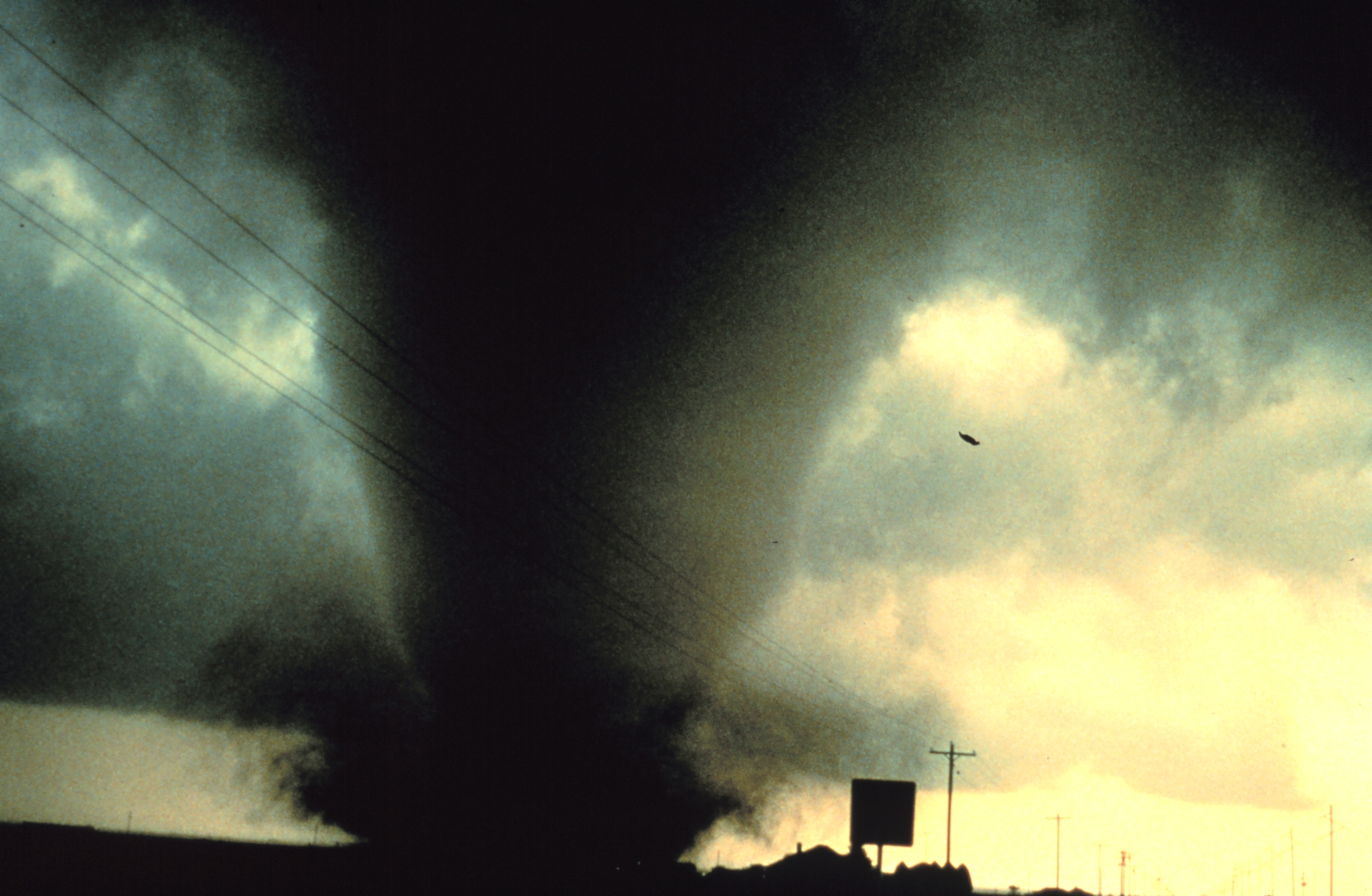
Dimmitt, Texas Tornado on June 2nd, 1995

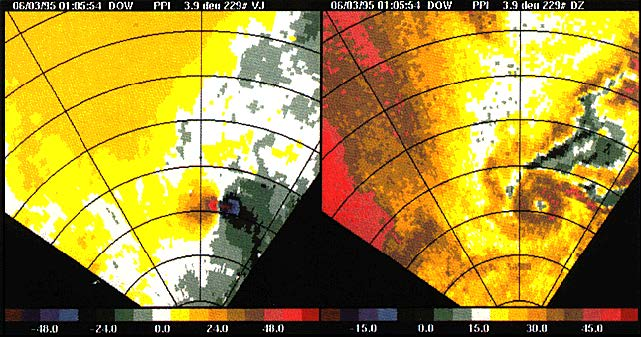
DOW 1 scan of Dimmitt, Texas tornado taken at 7:06 PM CDT on June 2nd, 1995

DOW 1 Radar Specifications
| Tx Power (Peak) | 40 kW |
| Antenna Dimension | 1.88 m Parabolic (increased to 2.44 m in 1996) |
| Beamwidth (3 dB) | 1.22° in 1995 (decreased to 0.93° in 1996) |
| Pulsewidth (μs) | 0.5 - 2.0 μs |
| Pulselength (μs) | 0.5–1.0 μs in 1995 (decreased to 0.25–1 μs in 1996) |
| Gatelength | 70 – 300 m (0.5 - 2.0 μs) (decreased to 25 – 300 m in 1996) |
| PRF | 500 – 2300 Hz w/stagger (increased to 500 – 4,000 in 1996) |
| Polarization | V |
| Processing | PIRAQ-1 |
| Products | V, Z, NCP, SW, DCZ |
| Antenna Scan Speed | 0 - 30°s - 1 |
| Antenna Scan Modes | PPI, RHI, SUR |

=== VORTEX-95 deployment ===
In an article published in the Fall/Winter 1995 NSSL Briefing newsletter, Project VORTEX director Erik Rasmussen discussed why the development of a mobile doppler radar was necessary after shortcomings faced during VORTEX-94 operations. While the mobile mesonets provided key insights into pressure, temperature, and humidity near the surface in the lead up to and during tornadogenesis, they failed to provide a detailed view of three dimensional airflow in the storm and its surrounding regions. Without a detailed view of airflow and conditions above the surface, project VORTEX researchers were unable to observe key ingredients and steps that occur during the formation of a tornado. While a NOAA WP-3 equipped with a C-Band doppler radar and the National Center for Atmospheric Research's ELDORA aircraft equipped with a X-Band doppler radar were used for VORTEX operations in both 1994 and 1995, they only provided data every 300 meters and were therefor unable to document the motion of air within small regions of the storm, especially the mesocyclone. This lack of information also meant that researchers were unable to verify several key hypothesis established prior to field operations.

To obtain data on wind variation and movement from altitudes of 100 meters to 10,000 meters, VORTEX scientists and the NSSL collaborated with University of Oklahoma School of Meteorology Assistant Professor Joshua Wurman, who had spent the past several years developing doppler radar technology at the National Center for Atmospheric Research, to develop a truck mounted doppler radar in time for the VORTEX-95 field campaign. The antenna pedestal and dish were taken from old military missile tracking radars, while the transmitter was provided by the NCAR from a CP-2 research radar. The receiver and signal processor were developed by Mitch Randell and Eric Loew, while the system was mostly built by NSSL technicians Paul Griffin and Dennis Nealson. For their work on the Doppler on Wheels, Griffin and Nealson were awarded the NOAA Bronze Medal. Parts for the Doppler on Wheels were ordered in November and December 1994, with testing taking place during March and April 1995. DOW 1 was first deployed on May 12, and scanned its first tornado just 4 days later on May 16 near Hanston, Kansas. DOW 1 was deployed on a ridge to the south of town and scanned as the tornado progressed for 45 minutes.

On June 2, DOW 1 was deployed to the Dimmitt Texas tornado, where it would scan one of the most studied tornadoes in history. The chase initially started in Friona Texas, where DOW 1, along with the rest of VORTEX-95 intercepted a violent F4 tornado. After dissipating, Rasmussen directed DOW 1, driven by Jerry Straka and operated by Wurman, to drive south towards an intensifying mesocyclone near Dimmitt, Texas. DOW 1 deployed south of town, and was able to start scanning before the tornado touched down. This meant that for the first time, meteorologists were able to observe highly detailed reflectivity and velocity radar data throughout the entire tornadogenesis process. After touching down, the tornado followed an arcing path, which kept it at a constant sub 2 miles from DOW 1. This close range radar intercept, combined with other data collected by probe teams, mobile mesonets, and airborne radar aircraft, resulted in the most comprehensive tornado research dataset ever produced, until VORTEX 2 intercepted the Goshen County, Wyoming EF2 in 2009.

=== Hurricane Fran ===
On September 5, 1996, Doppler on Wheels 1 intercepted Hurricane Fran at New Hanover International Airport in Wilmington, North Carolina. This marked the first time a Doppler on Wheels was able to study a hurricane and its eyewall. At the time of landfall and DOW data collection, Hurricane Fran was at Category 3 strength. The DOW was stationed 50 km northeast of the KLTX radar and was able to measure data at 75 m resolution compared to KLTX's 250 m resolution, meaning the KLTX resolution was coarser by a factor of 3.5 to 7. This higher resolution data and faster scanning speed allowed the DOW to observe several small phenomena in far greater detail and at lower altitudes than more traditional large, slow scanning radars. The primary observation enabled by this greater resolution was sub-kilometer-scale boundary layer rolls, which had never been studied in the field before. These sub-km boundary layer rolls, which are horizontal streamwise roll vortices, produce localized high velocity horizontal winds and contribute to uneven wind damage produced by hurricanes. This groundbreaking research enabled by the DOW would lead to future discoveries over the coming 2 decades, including radar observations of tornado-scale vortices (TSV) and eyewall mesovortices (MVs). These discoveries help explain why hurricane wind damage varies so greatly over small differences.

DOW 1 Research Missions
| Year | Name | Full Name | Location | Focus |
|---|---|---|---|---|
| 1995 | VORTEX | Verification of the Origins of Rotation in Tornadoes Experiment | Great Plains | Tornadoes |
| 1995 | SCMS | Small Cumulus Mesoscale Study | Florida | Cloud convection measurement |
| 1996 | FLATLAND | FLATLAND/LIFT | Illinois | Boundary layer |
| 1996 | Microburst | MIT Microburst | New Mexico | Microbursts |
| 1996 | HAL-96 | Hurricane Fran | Atlantic Coast | Hurricanes at landfall |

== Doppler on Wheels 2 ==
DOW 2
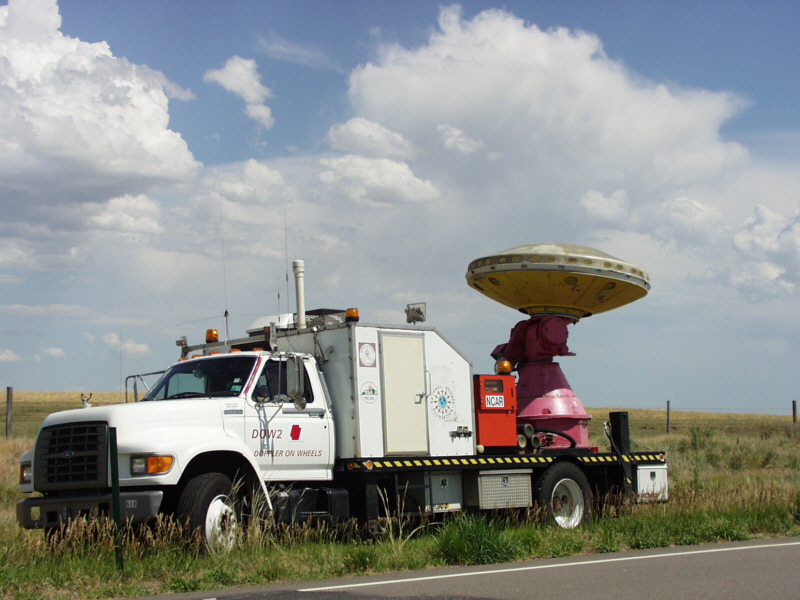
- Country of origin: USA
- Designer: Joshua Wurman
- Introduced: 1997
- No. built: 1
- Type: Weather Radar
- Frequency: X-band
- PRF: 500 - 5000 Hz (+stagger)
- Beamwidth: (3dB) 0.93°
- Pulsewidth: 0.1 - 2.0 μs
- Power: 250 kW (Peak Tx Power)
- Other names: 2nd Generation Doppler on Wheels

The second generation of DOWs were deployed in 1997, improving on virtually every aspect of the first. DOW 2 was built off the base of a modified 1995 Ford F700, being able to reach 74 mph and weighing 25,000 lbs when fully equipped with its radar and scientific instrumentation.

DOW 2 used a surplus 2.44 m antenna from NCAR's CP-2 radar, being able to achieve a beamwidth of 0.93°. This was mounted on a spare pedestal from NCAR's CP-3 radar, often noted for its bright red color. This pedestal came with improved scan rotation speed, now being able to achieve 60° per second. The most important update was to the DOW's Tx power. While DOW 1 was only able to have a maximum transmit power of 40 kW, DOW 2 was able to reach a peak Tx power of 250 kW. This increase in power allowed for improved sensitivity to low reflectivity and clear air. The receiver was also redesigned to be compatible with mobile bistatic systems.

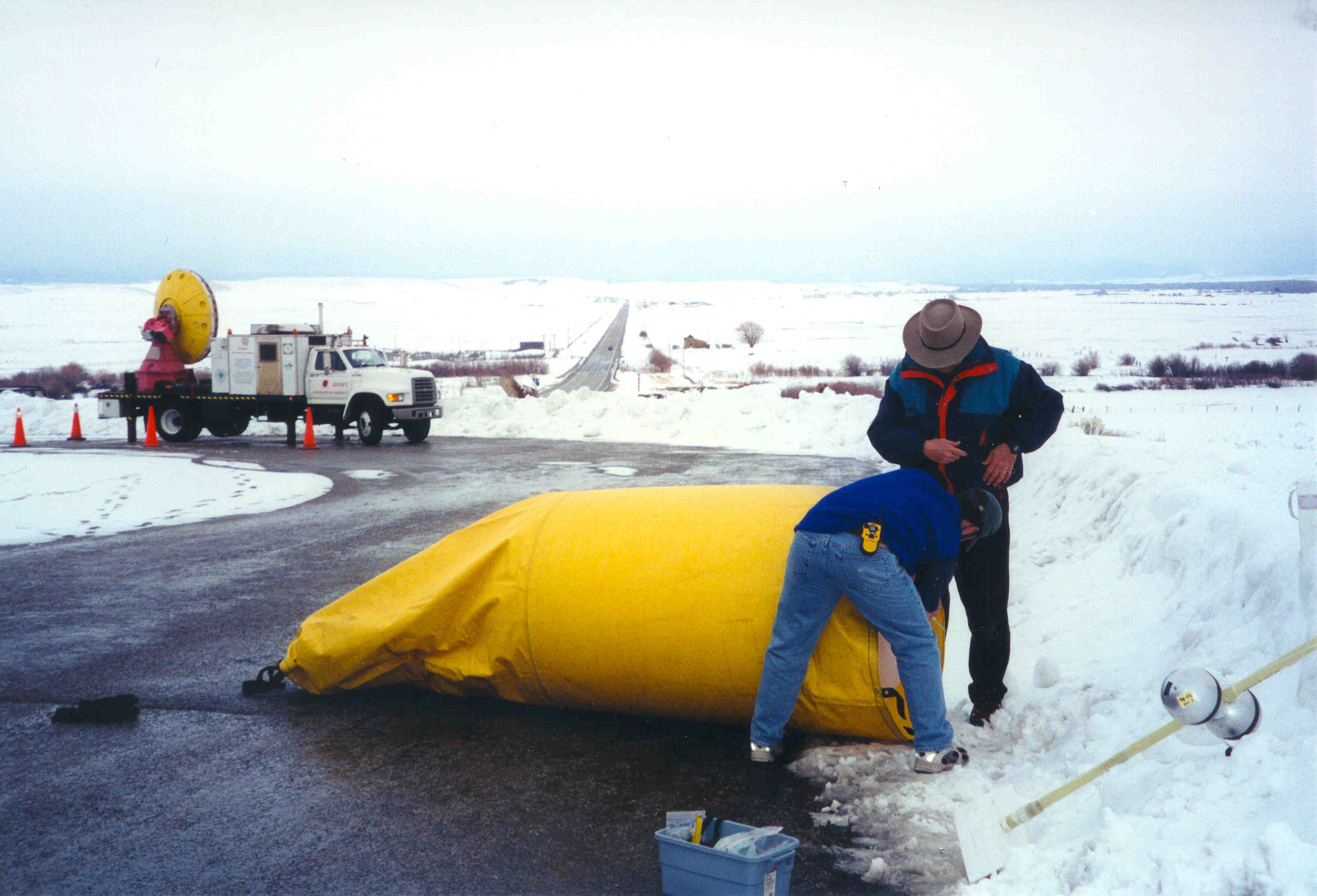
Doppler on Wheels 2 (DOW 2) during IPEX 2000, taken sometime between 31 January - 25 February 2000.

DOW 2 Radar Specifications
| Tx Power (Peak) | 250 kW |
| Antenna Dimension | 2.44 m Parabolic |
| Beamwidth (3 dB) | 0.93° |
| Pulsewidth (μs) | 0.1 - 2.0 μs |
| Pulselength (μs) | 0.167 - 1.0 μs |
| Gatelength | 12.5 - 300 (0.08 - 2 μs) |
| PRF | 500–5000 Hz (+stagger) |
| Polarization | H or V |
| Processing | PIRAQ-2 |
| Products | V, Z, NCP, SW, DCZ |
| Antenna Scan Speed | 0 - 60°s - 1 |
| Antenna Scan Modes | PPI, RHI, SUR, Solar |

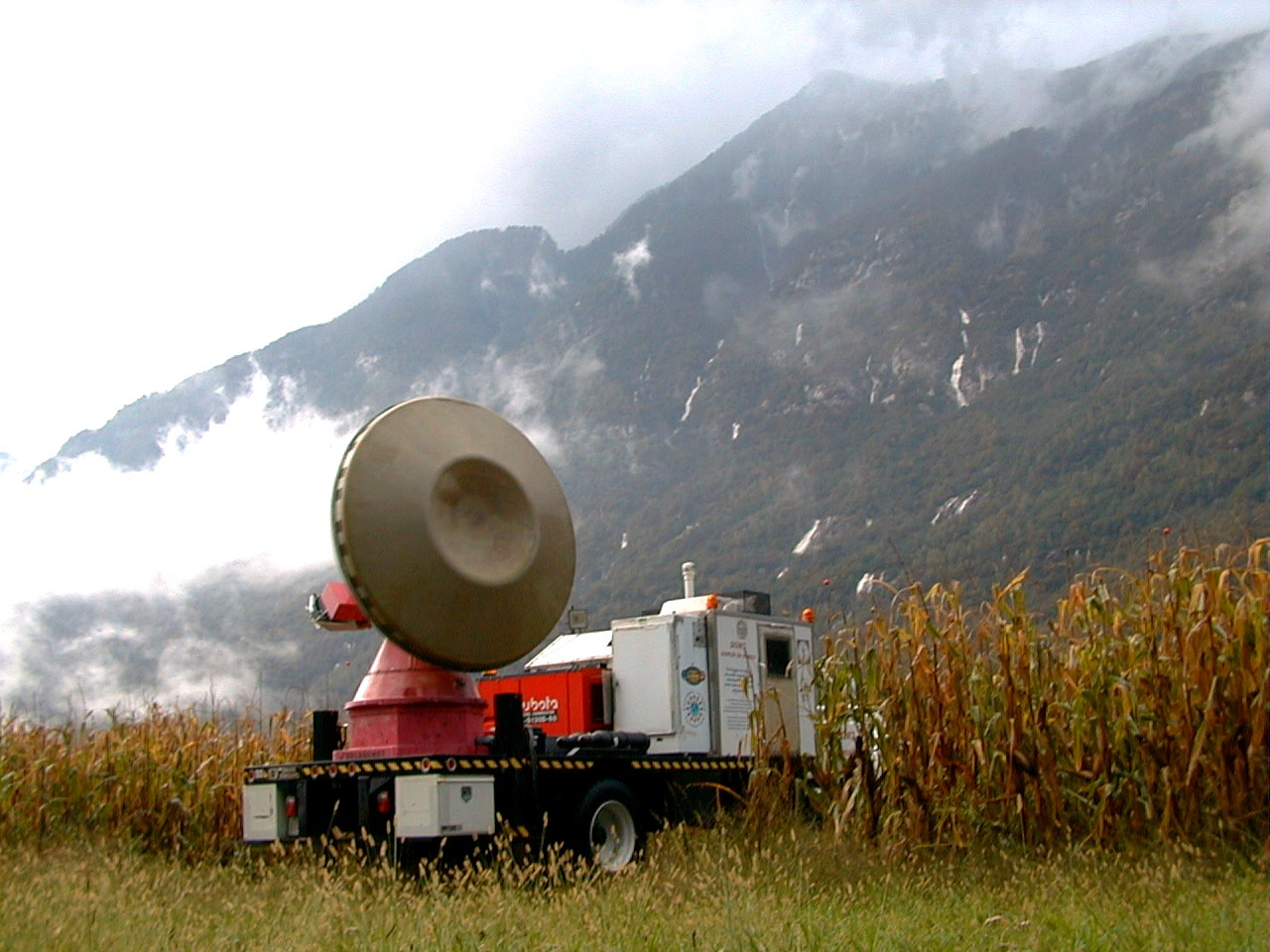
Doppler on Wheels 2 (DOW 2) Participating in Mesoscale Alpine Project 1999 (MAP) Near Lodrino, Switzerland

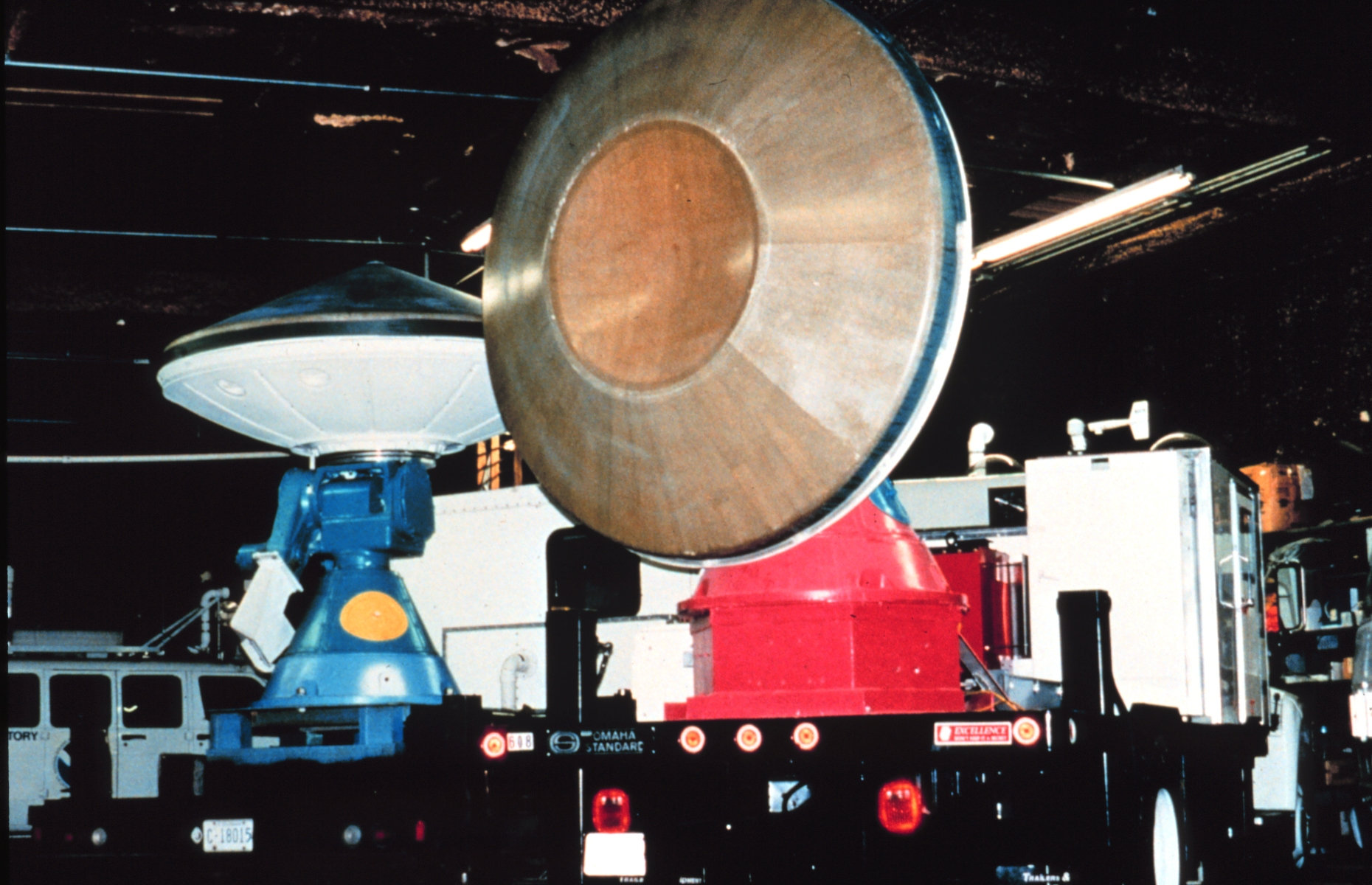
DOW 2 next to DOW 1 with 1996 upgraded radar in University of Oklahoma garage

=== Research missions ===
DOW 2 was active from 1997 to 2007, first being used for Coastal Meteorology Research Program 1997 (CMRP) in Florida. While DOW 2 was used alongside DOW 3 for domestic research projects, including Radar Observations of Tornadoes And Thunderstorms Experiment (ROTATE) 1998–2004, and Hurricanes at Landfall (HAL), it is perhaps more notable for the research it conducted in Europe. DOW 2 was deployed to Switzerland in 1999 for the Mesoscale Alpine Programme (MAP), studying atmospheric and hydrological processes over mountainous terrain with the goal of better understanding how complex topography impacts weather systems. In 2007, DOW 2 was deployed to France and Germany for the Convective and Orographically Induced Precipitation Study (COPS), studying how orographic terrain influences convective precipitation. According to the U.S. Department of Energy's Atmospheric Radiation Measurement (ARM), there were three primary questions investigated:

- What are the processes responsible for the formation and evolution of convective clouds in orographic terrain?
- What are the microphysical properties of orographically induced clouds and how do these depend on dynamics, thermodynamics, and aerosol microphysics?
- How can convective clouds in orographic terrain be represented in atmospheric models based on AMF, COPS, and GOP data?

After COPS 2007, DOW 2 was retired with the introduction of DOW 6 at the start of the 2008 storm season.

DOW 2 Research Missions
| Year | Name | Full Name | Location | Focus |
|---|---|---|---|---|
| 1997-98 | CMRP | Coastal Meteorology Research Program | Florida | Marine boundary layer |
| 1997-2004 | HAL | Hurricanes at Landfall | Gulf/Atlantic Coast | Hurricanes at landfall |
| 1998 | ROTATE-98 | Radar Observations of Tornadoes and Thunderstorms Experiment | Great Plains | Dual-Doppler tornado radar scans |
| 1998 | CALJET | California Landfall Jet Experiment | California | Coastal low-level jets, El Nino |
| 1999 | ROTATE-99 | Radar Observations of Tornadoes and Thunderstorms Experiment | Great Plains | Dual-Doppler tornado radar scans |
| 1999 | MAP | Mesoscale Alpine Programme | Switzerland | Orographic precipitation |
| 1999-2002 | JAWS | Juneau Airport Wind Systems | Juneau, Alaska | Mountain turbulence |
| 2000 | IPEX | Intermountain Precipitation Experiment | Utah | Orographic precipitation |
| 2000 | ROTATE-2000 | Radar Observations of Tornadoes and Thunderstorms Experiment | Great Plains | Dual-Doppler tornado radar scans |
| 2000 | STEPS | Severe Thunderstorm Electrification and Precip Study | Colorado–Kansas | Thunderstorm electrification |
| 2000–01 | GCW | Goodwin Creek Watershed | Mississippi | Hydrology |
| 2001 | ROTATE-2001 | Radar Observations of Tornadoes and Thunderstorms Experiment | Great Plains | Dual-Doppler tornado radar scans |
| 2002 | IHOP | International H2O Project | Great Plains | Convection initiation |
| 2002 | Hayman Fire | Hayman Fire | Colorado | Fire |
| 2003 | ROTATE-2003 | Radar Observations of Tornadoes and Thunderstorms Experiment | Great Plains | Dual-Doppler tornado radar scans |
| 2003 | CRP | Canadian River Project | Oklahoma | Bacteria/chemical agent |
| 2004 | ROTATE-2004 | Radar Observations of Tornadoes and Thunderstorms Experiment | Great Plains | Dual-Doppler tornado radar scans |
| 2007 | COPS | Convective and Orographically induced Precip Study | Germany–France | Convective and orographic precipitation |

== Doppler on Wheels 3 ==
DOW 3
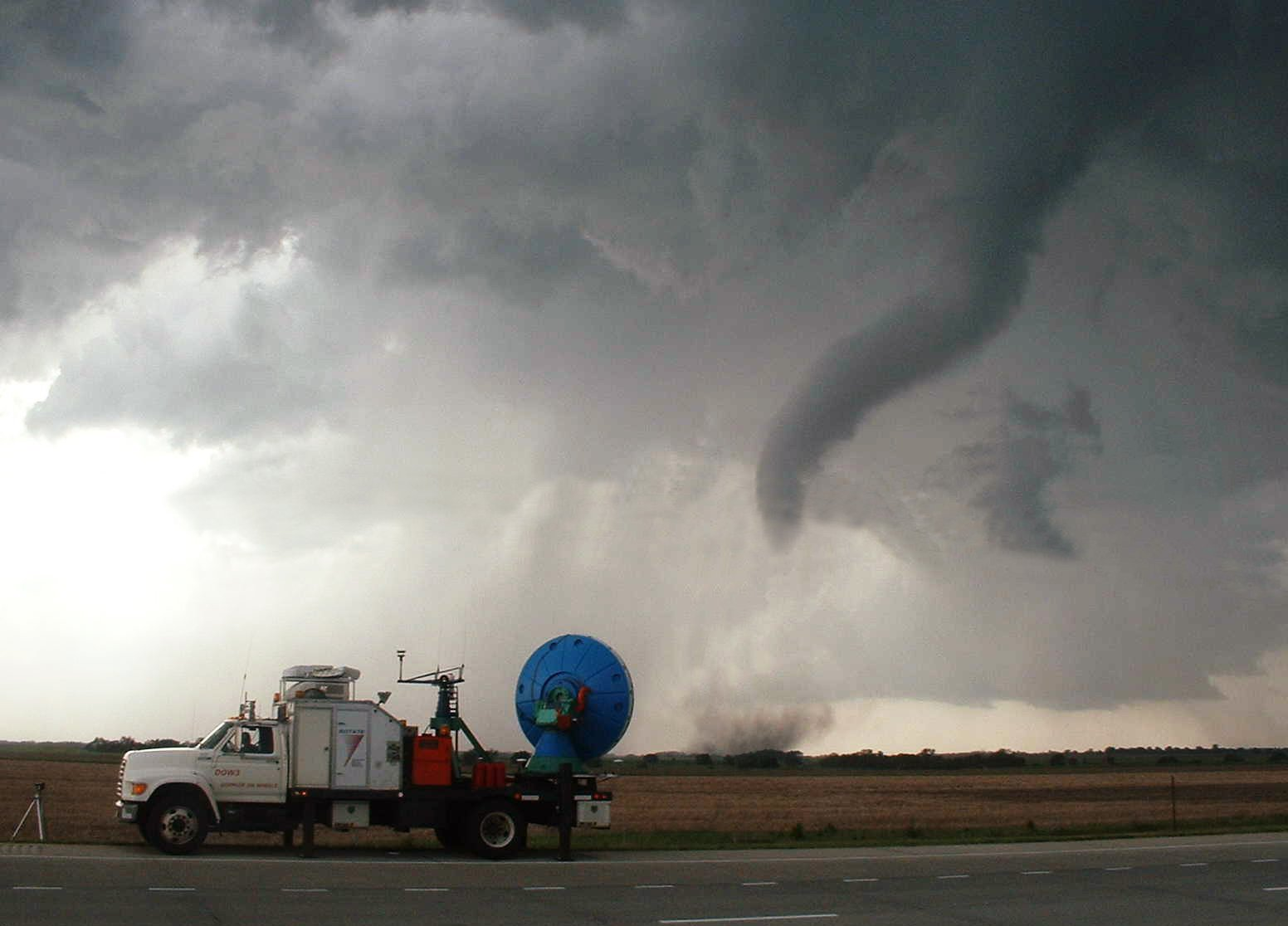
- Country of origin: USA
- Designer: Joshua Wurman
- Introduced: 1997
- No. built: 1
- Type: Weather Radar
- Frequency: X-band
- PRF: 500 - 5000 Hz (+stagger)
- Beamwidth: (3dB) 0.93°
- Pulsewidth: 0.1 - 2.0 μs
- Power: 250 kW (Peak Tx Power)
- Other names: 2nd Generation Doppler on Wheels

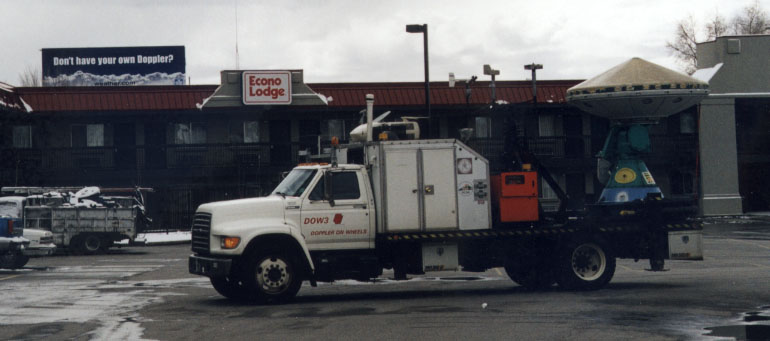
Doppler on Wheels 3 during Intermountain Precipitation EXperiment (IPEX) operations

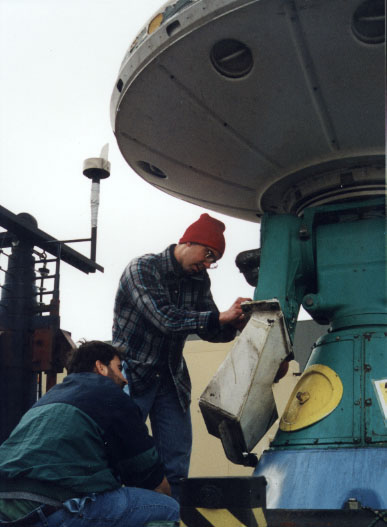
Doppler on Wheels 3 radar

DOW 3 was the other second generation Doppler on Wheels developed in 1997, being finished shortly after DOW 2 and replacing the now retired DOW 1. DOW 3 was largely the same as DOW 2, but incorporated several pieces of hardware including the green radar pedestal and a differently shaped radar dish that were originally used on DOW 1. The actual truck, a modified 1995 Ford F700, was identical to DOW 2 apart from small cosmetic differences. Both second generation DOWs were also outfitted with an extendable 10 meter meteorological and communication masts, allowing for both atmospheric measurements such as temperature, wind speed, and pressure, while also allowing for extended radio communications and better internet signal.

DOW 3's radar specifications were also the same as DOW 2, excluding the cosmetic radar dish covering the antenna. This included a peak Tx power of 250 kW, a 2.44 m parabolic antenna, a beamwidth of 0.93°, a pulsewidth of 0.1 - 2.0 μs, and a staggered PRF between 500 and 5000 Hz. In 1999, DOWs 2 and 3 were upgraded with new antenna control hardware and software.

DOW 3 Radar Specifications
| Tx Power (Peak) | 250 kW |
| Antenna Dimension | 2.44 m Parabolic |
| Beamwidth (3 dB) | 0.93° |
| Pulsewidth (μs) | 0.1 - 2.0 μs |
| Pulselength (μs) | 0.167 - 1.0 μs |
| Gatelength | 12.5 - 300 (0.08 - 2 μs) |
| PRF | 500–5000 Hz (+stagger) |
| Polarization | H or V |
| Processing | PIRAQ-2 |
| Products | V, Z, NCP, SW, DCZ |
| Antenna Scan Speed | 0 - 60°s - 1 |
| Antenna Scan Modes | PPI, RHI, SUR, Solar |

=== Documentary and TV notoriety ===
Throughout the 2000s, Wurman and the DOW Network, which consisted of DOWs 2, 3, and 5, appeared on several notable documentaries that raised the profile of both the Doppler on Wheels program and storm chasing more broadly. In 2000, TLC aired a 4 part TV documentary series produced by Pioneer Productions titled "Tornado". Episode 4 of the documentary series, titled "Tornado Chasers", focused on several groups of storm chasers including the DOW team at the University of Oklahoma and their observation of the 1998 Spencer, South Dakota tornado and 1999 Bridge Creek–Moore tornado using DOW 2 and 3. In 2003, the documentary series Nature Tech produced an episode detailing the world of storm chasing, covering both scientific research and recreation. The scientific research portion focused on the evolution of using doppler radar to detect tornadoes, and starred mobile research radars operated by Howard Bluestein using the UMass Mobile W-Band Radar and Joshua Wurman using DOWs 2, 3, and 5 for dual doppler deployments.

DOW 3 Research Missions
| Year | Name | Full Name | Location | Focus |
|---|---|---|---|---|
| 1997-98 | CMRP | Coastal Meteorology Research Program | Florida | Marine boundary layer |
| 1997-2007 | HAL | Hurricanes at Landfall | Gulf/Atlantic Coast | Hurricanes at landfall |
| 1998 | ROTATE-98 | Radar Observations of Tornadoes and Thunderstorms Experiment | Great Plains | Dual-Doppler tornado radar scans |
| 1998 | CALJET | California Landfall Jet Experiment | California | Coastal low-level jets, El Nino |
| 1999 | ROTATE-99 | Radar Observations of Tornadoes and Thunderstorms Experiment | Great Plains | Dual-Doppler tornado radar scans |
| 1999-2002 | JAWS | Juneau Airport Wind Systems | Juneau, Alaska | Mountain turbulence |
| 2000 | IPEX | Intermountain Precipitation Experiment | Utah | Orographic precipitation |
| 2000 | ROTATE-2000 | Radar Observations of Tornadoes and Thunderstorms Experiment | Great Plains | Dual-Doppler tornado radar scans |
| 2000 | STEPS | Severe Thunderstorm Electrification and Precip Study | Colorado–Kansas | Thunderstorm electrification |
| 2001 | ROTATE-2001 | Radar Observations of Tornadoes and Thunderstorms Experiment | Great Plains | Dual-Doppler tornado radar scans |
| 2002 | IHOP | International H2O Project | Great Plains | Convection initiation |
| 2002 | Prince Albert | Prince Albert Fire | Saskatchewan | Fire |
| 2003 | ROTATE-2003 | Radar Observations of Tornadoes and Thunderstorms Experiment | Great Plains | Dual-Doppler tornado radar scans |
| 2003 | Chico | Chico Fire Suppression | California | Fire suppression guidance |
| 2003 | CRP | Canadian River Project | Oklahoma | Bacteria/chemical agent |
| 2004 | ROTATE-2004 | Radar Observations of Tornadoes and Thunderstorms Experiment | Great Plains | Dual-Doppler tornado radar scans |
| 2005 | ROTATE-2005 | Radar Observations of Tornadoes and Thunderstorms Experiment | Great Plains | Low level tornado radar scans and TIV guidance |
| 2006 | ROTATE-2006 | Radar Observations of Tornadoes and Thunderstorms Experiment | Great Plains | Low level tornado radar scans and TIV guidance |
| 2007 | ROTATE-2007 | Radar Observations of Tornadoes and Thunderstorms Experiment | Great Plains | Low level tornado radar scans and TIV guidance |
| 2007 | COPS | Convective and Orographically induced Precip Study | Germany–France | Convective and orographic precipitation |

== Doppler on Wheels 4 (Dual Polarization) ==
DOW 4
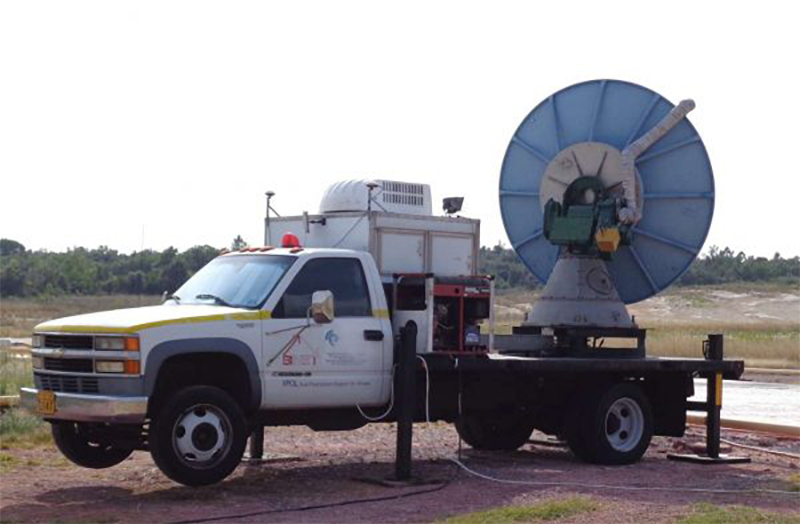
- Country of origin: USA
- Manufacturer: BINET Inc and National Center for Atmospheric Research
- Designer: Joshua Wurman
- Introduced: 2000
- No. built: 1
- Type: Weather Radar
- Frequency: X-band
- PRF: 500 - 3000 Hz (+stagger)
- Beamwidth: (3dB) 0.93°
- Pulsewidth: 0.1 - 2.0 μs
- Range: 150 km
- Power: 70 kW (Peak Tx Power)
- Other names: XPOL, XPOW, Dual Polarization Doppler on Wheels, X-band Polarimetric On Wheels

DOW 4 was ordered by the National Observatory of Athens and completed in 2000, first participating in the CAMEX-4 Keys Area Microphysics Project in early September 2001. Unlike DOWs 1, 2, and 3, it was not part of the University of Oklahoma Mobile Radar Research Lab and therefor constructed as a joint venture by the National Center for Atmospheric Research and Wurman's private company, BINET Inc. It was built on a 1999 Chevrolet 3500HD chassis, smaller than the Ford F700 used for DOWs 2 and 3 but better optimized for narrower European roadways.

DOW 4 was the first Doppler on Wheels to possess dual polarization, meaning it could scan using horizontal and vertical radar polarizations simultaneously and therefor better differentiate between different types of precipitation. Before being transferred to the National Observatory of Athens and stationed at the Penteli Observatory, DOW 4 was able to participate in several research studies including Iowa Precipitation Experiments, CAMEX-4 Keys Area Microphysics Project (KAMP), and The International H2O Project 2002 (IHOP).

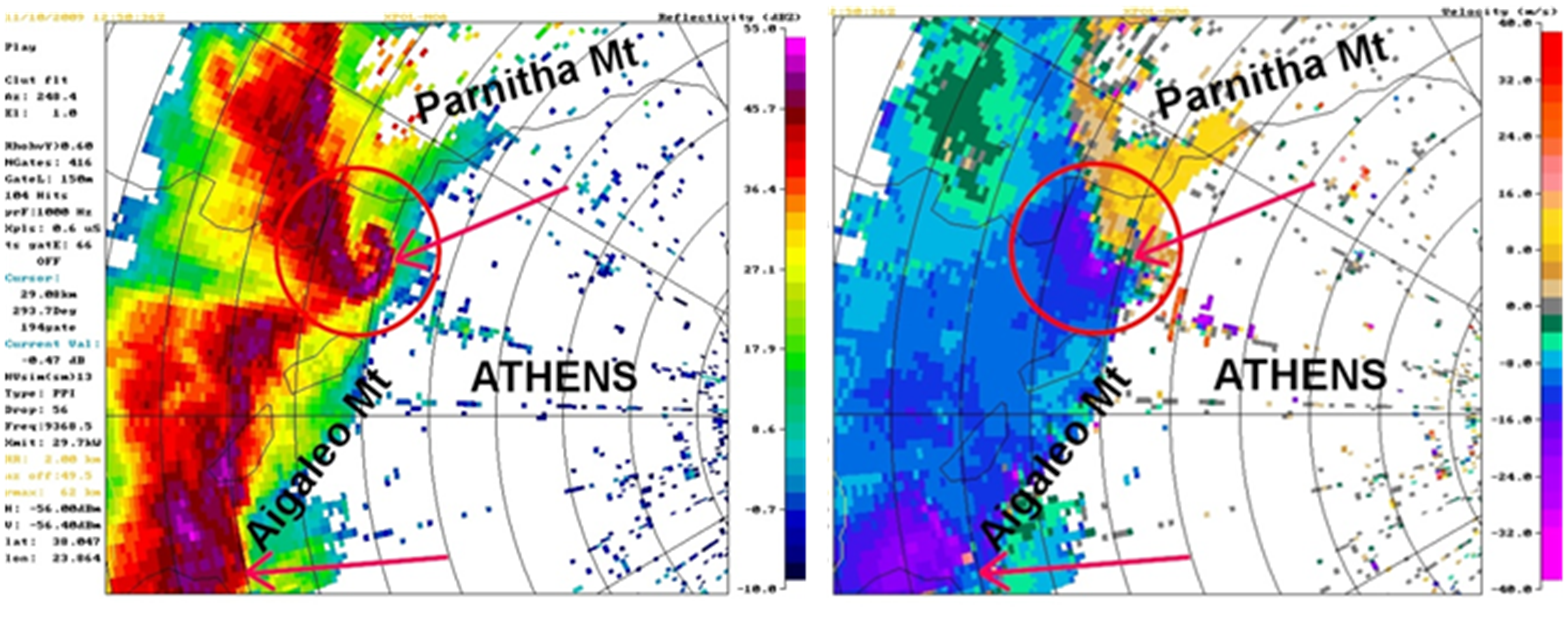
XPOL scan of an F1 tornado over Athens in 2009

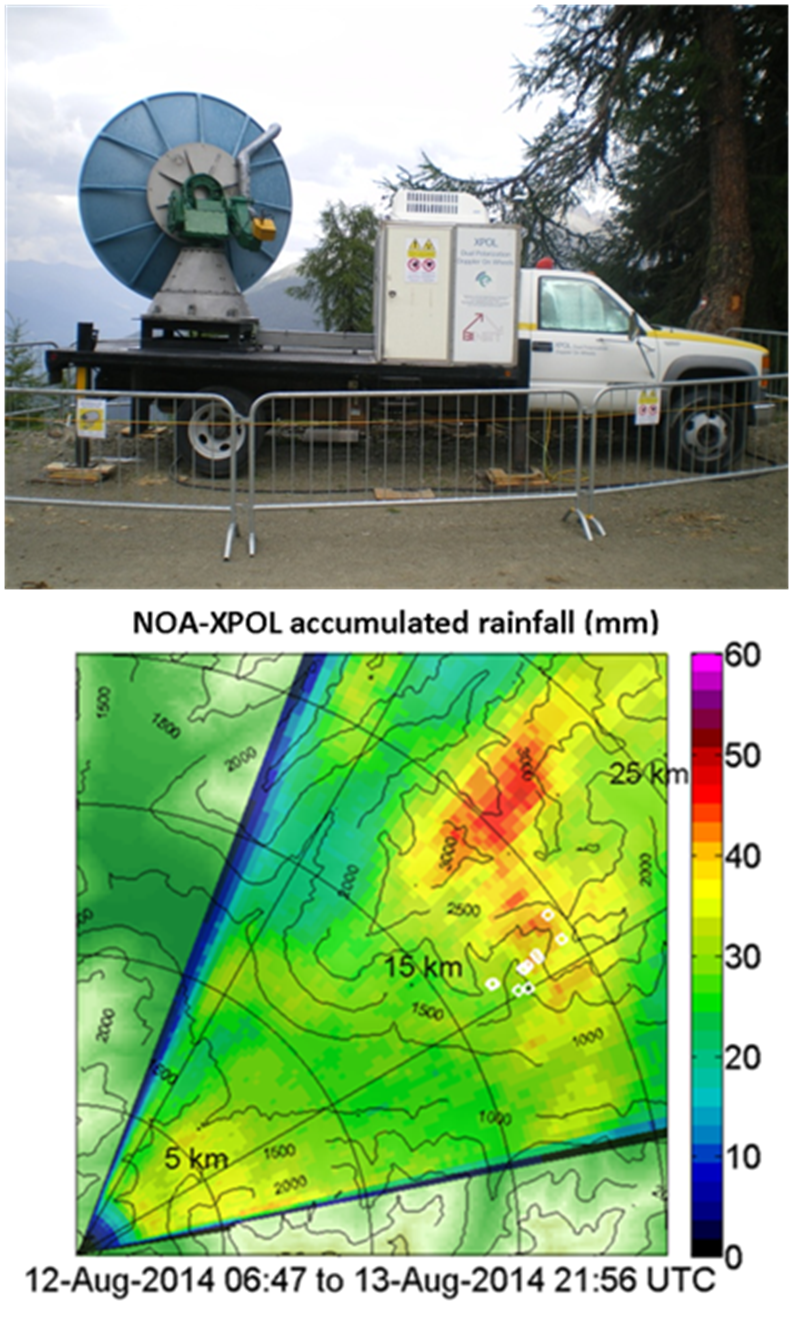
XPOL accumulated rainfall over the Italian Alps in 2012

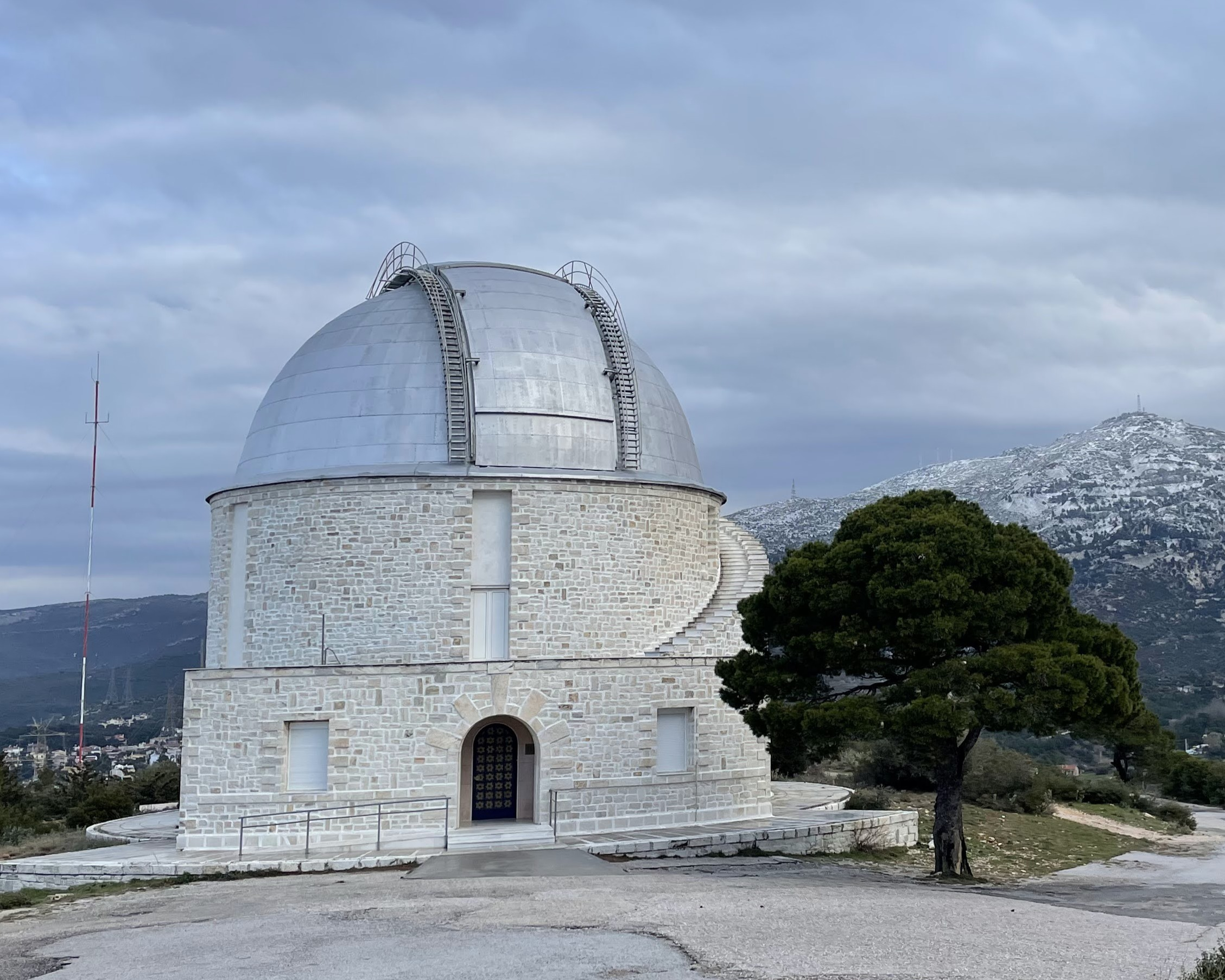
Penteli Observatory where DOW4 is stationed

DOW 4 Radar Specifications
| Tx Power (Peak) | 70 kW |
| Antenna Dimension | 2.44 m Parabolic |
| Beamwidth (3 dB) | 0.93° |
| Pulsewidth (μs) | 0.1 - 2.0 μs |
| Gatelength | 30 - 500 (0.2 - 2 μs) |
| PRF | 500–3000 Hz (+stagger) |
| Polarization | H and V simultaneous |
| Processing | PIRAQ-2 |
| Products | V, Z, SW, NCP, DCZ, ZDR, ρHV |
| Antenna Scan Speed | 0 - 25°s - 1 (originally listed as 0 - 60°s) |
| Antenna Scan Modes | PPI, RHI, SUR, Solar |

=== Service under Institute of Environmental Research and Sustainable Development ===
After the International H2O Project 2002, DOW 4 was shipped to Europe, where it would serve under the Institute of Environmental Research and Sustainable Development (IERSD) of the National Observatory of Athens and subsequently be referred to as the XPOL Mobile Weather Radar. Under IERSD, XPOL was assigned to the Atmospheric Remote Sensing Meteorological Applications (AReSMA) group, whose researchers include John Kalogiros, Marios Anagnostou, Adrianos Retalis, Dimirtios Katsanos, Nikos Roukounakis, and Panagiotis Portalakis. Under AReSMA's care, XPOL was upgraded to have a maximum Tx power of 70 kw, improved processing boards removing bandwidth limitations caused by their original processor's DMA slave mode, and range of 150 km. AReSMA uses XPOL to conduct hydrometeorological studies across the Mediterranean, where it's often paired with disdrometers and advanced rain gauges to study rain microphysics. When XPOL is not being used for field campaigns, it's stationed at the Penteli Observatory and serves as a stationary weather radar providing a live radar feed over Athens and assisting with WRFDA nowcasts.

In 2004, the National Observatory of Athens partnered with the University of Connecticut to conduct the Ionian Sea Rainfall Experiment (ISREX), a research study using acoustic soundings to measure rainfall over oceans and large bodies of water. The NOA used the XPOL radar to provide real time high resolution precipitation scans while a network of acoustic rain gauges, tipping bucket rain gauges, and 2D video disdrometers collected rainfall data. This data was combined with visual and infrared images from a Meteosat to provide comprehensive datasets for several rain events over the Mediterranean Sea and test the accuracy of using underwater acoustics to measure rainfall. In 2007, XPOL took part in Hydrate European FP6 (HYDRATE), a research project focused on improving flash flood prediction and warning across Europe. The XPOL radar was used in collaboration with the University of Padova and stationed in the Northeast Italian Alps from August to October, where it provided scanning coverage alongside two other C-band radar units. In 2011, XPOL took part in HydroRad European FP7 (HydroRad), a research project with the goal of developing an integrated decision support tool for weather monitoring and hydro-meteorological applications using a network of mini dual-polarized X-band weather radars (MiniPolX). The three MiniPolX radars were spaced 20–30 km apart, with the Greek XPOL radar stationed at the center of the network to serve as a reference point to compare the efficacy of the mini-radars to a single, more powerful unit. The study found that while the mini-radar network suffered from partial beam blockage and significant vertical averaging at longer ranges, it was effective at accurately measuring rainfall values and is suitable to function as a reliable low-cost solution for weather and flood monitoring at local scale.

From 2012 to 2014, XPOL took part in two research projects studying precipitation patterns in Europe. The first was HyMex, which aimed to study hydrological cycles and related processes across the Mediterranean and gain a better understanding of high impact weather events and how the Mediterranean coupled system varies year to year. Similar to HydroRad in 2011, the XPOL radar paired with the National Research Council of Italy's Polar 55C C-band radar to serve as a benchmark for the MiniPolX network of radars. The XPOL and MiniPolX radars were placed within 300 meters of the Polar 55C radar and observed 53 rainy day events between September 2012 and March 2013 (HyMex SOP1). The findings were similar to the results of HydroRad, where MiniPolX was found to accurately measure rainfall accumulation and be an effective, cheap localized radar that can help with detecting weather induced hazards. Another goal of XPOL during HyMex was to evaluate the hydrologic impacts of the North-East Italian Alpine Region and help develop better flash flood detection methods. For HyMex SOP2 during 2013–2014, the XPOL radar was stationed at Deaux Airport, which is located south of Alès in Southern France. XPOL's data was used to help quantify how small errors in modeled precipitation from high resolution satellite precipitation products leads to inaccuracies in flood modelling and warning. XPOL's radar measurements were also compared to several French ARAMIS radar network systems, including a C-band radar stationed in Sembadel and two S-band radars stationed in Nîmes and Bollène. The second research project was HYDRO-X, which took place between 2013 and 2014. Like HyMex, it focused on measuring precipitation with XPOL’s radar and using the data to validate satellite precipitation estimations. XPOL was stationed in the Italian Alps south of Trafoi, overseeing the Gardia and Mazia watersheds. Between 26 July and 22 September 2014, XPOL recorded a total of 29 rain events, although only 10 had had rain accumulation larger than 3mm in the Gardia watershed. The study found that passive microwave sensors (PMW) overestimate rainfall in comparison to ground based observations.

From 2014 to 2020, XPOL participated in two research projects for the National Observatory of Athens. The i-ALARMS project saw XPOL stationed on Corfu Island, where it helped develop an early warning system for damaging weather events across Albania, Greece, the Adriatic Sea, and the Ionian Sea. By 2021, the early warning monitoring system had been developed and emergency managers across the region were trained in how to use the system. i-ALARMS consists of a 90,000 km^{2} warning area broken into sixteen 5,625 km^{2} boxes, operating over a 6 hour projected window. Each warning box is assigned one of four colors, consisting of clear (no adverse weather warning), yellow (dangerous weather conditions expected), orange (very dangerous weather conditions expected), and red (extremely dangerous weather conditions expected). THESPIA II also took place from 2014 to 2020, and focused on improving nowcasting across Greece by better integrating sensors, methodologies, and meteorological equipment.

DOW 4 Research Missions
| Year | Name | Full Name | Location | Focus |
|---|---|---|---|---|
| 2001 | CAMEX-4 KAMP | Convection and Moisture Experiment 4 Keys Area Microphysics Project | Florida | Tropical Cyclones and quantitative precipitation estimates improvement |
| 2001 | Iowa | University of Iowa Precipitation Experiments | Iowa | Precipitation |
| 2002 | IHOP | International H2O Project | Great Plains | Convection initiation |
| 2004 | ISREX | Ionian Sea Rainfall Experiment | Pylos | Oceanic rainfall measurement using underwater acoustic measurements |
| 2007 | HYDRATE | Hydrate European FP6 project | Crete | Flash floods |
| 2007 | HydroRad | HydroRad European FP7 project | Moldova Bsin | X-band radar network evaluation |
| 2012-2014 | HyMex | Hydrological cycle in the Mediterranean Experiment | Eastern Alps | Flash floods |
| 2013-2014 | Hydro-X | Advancing hydrometeorological uses of X-band dual polarization radar | Italian Alps | Satellite microwave sensor evaluation |
| 2014-2020 | i-ALARMS | Ionian-Adriatic earLy wARning Monitoring | Corfu Island | Warning system evaluation |
| 2014-2020 | THESPIA II | Foundations of synergistic and integrated management methodologies and tools for monitoring and forecasting of environmental issues and pressures | Greece | Nowcasting development |
| Present | Greece | National Observatory of Athens Radar | Greece | Measure rainfall |

== Doppler on Wheels 5 (Rapid Scan) ==
DOW 5
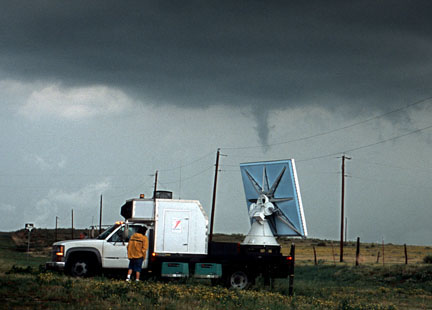
- Country of origin: USA
- Designer: Joshua Wurman
- Introduced: 2003
- No. built: 1
- Type: Weather Radar
- Frequency: 9.3-9.8 GHz (X-band)
- PRF: 500 - 7000 Hz (+stagger)
- Beamwidth: (3dB) 0.8°
- Pulsewidth: 0.125 - 2.0 μs
- Power: 40 kW (Peak Tx Power)
- Other names: RS DOW, Rapid Scan DOW

DOW 5 radar loop of the 2009 Goshen County tornado during VORTEX 2 operations.

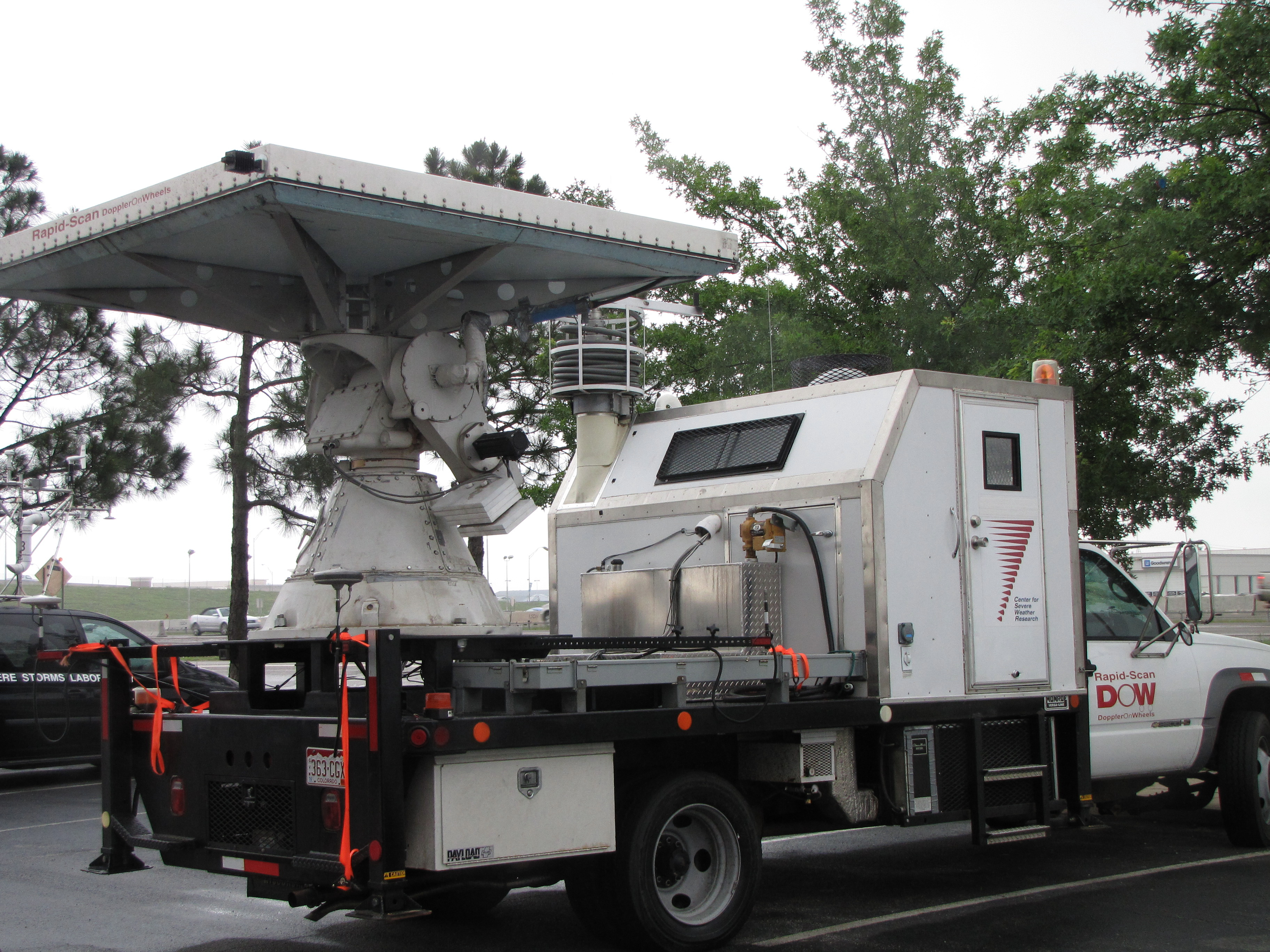
DOW 5 back profile.

DOW 5 began construction in 2001 with the goal of fitting a phased array radar capable of rapidly scanning a storm environment and detecting small changes in storm evolution that occur within timescales too short to detect using traditional parabolic antenna radars, including those on DOWs and National Weather Service WSR-88D NEXRAD radars. While originally planned to be part of the University of Oklahoma's Mobile Radar Research Lab, DOW 5 was completed in 2003 and transferred to the Center for Severe Weather Research, along with Wurman's other DOW radars.

DOW 5 is unique in that it was the first mobile weather radar platform to feature a phased array radar, which utilizes many smaller antennas to near simultaneously transmit and receive high resolution data in very short timescales usually missed by slower scanning mechanical radars. Because conventional phased array technologies are prohibitively expensive to design and deploy, especially in the early 2000s when DOW 5 was developed, it utilizes a hybrid electronic and mechanical scanning system. DOW 5 maintains mechanically rotating azimuth while incorporating frequency based electronic vertical steering. This is achieved by using a vertically aligned array of slotted waveguide antennas that produce 6 - 10 near simultaneous radar beams at different frequencies, providing a single polarization volumetric scan at 6 elevations in 6 seconds. DOW 5's radar does have several drawbacks compared to parabolic antenna radars, primarily considering its range. DOW 5 has a radar scanning range of 10 km, although ideal measurements are much closer at sub 3 km ranges. This is much shorter than other DOWs, which have a maximum radar range of 60 km. This makes DOW 5's general application much more narrow, especially on research missions where there is greater uncertainty and sparse road networks.

DOW 5 Radar Specifications
| Tx Power (Peak) | 40 kW |
| Phased Array Dimension | 2.4 m x 2.6 - 3.0 m |
| Phased Array Technology Type | Frequency-based, electronic steering |
| Frequency Range | 9.3 - 9.8 GHz |
| Beamwidth (3 dB) | 0.8° (6 beams) |
| Pulsewidth (μs) | 0.125 - 2.0 μs |
| Gatelength | 25 – 75 m (0.2 - 2 μs) |
| PRF | 500–7000 Hz (+stagger) |
| Polarization | H or V |
| Processing | PIRAQ-3 |
| Products | V, Z, SW, NCP, P |
| Antenna Scan Speed | 0 - 50°s - 1 (7 second volumes) |
| Antenna Scan Modes | PPI, RHI, SUR, Solar |

=== Meteorological application of rapid-scan technology ===
Rapid scanning radars are incredibly useful for studying tornadoes, microbursts, hurricanes, hurricane boundary layer wind streaks, and other meteorological phenomenon that occur within incredibly short timescales. In the case of tornadoes, rapid scan radar data is crucial to understand they key processes in the lead up to and during tornadogenesis, what tornadogenesis mode is occurring (non-descending, descending, or simultaneous), what changes in a storm can lead to the sudden strengthening or weakening of a tornado, what processes precede and occur during tornado dissipation, and how factors such as RFD play a role throughout a tornado's lifespan. For hurricanes, rapid scanning technology allows for radars to observe and study vortex Rossby waves, tornado-scale vortices within hurricanes that last less than 10 seconds, hurricane boundary layer rolls, and provide an overall better understanding of destructive winds within hurricanes.

DOW 5 Research Missions
| Year | Name | Full Name | Location | Focus |
|---|---|---|---|---|
| 2003 | ROTATE-2003 | Radar Observations of Tornadoes and Thunderstorms Experiment | Great Plains | Dual-Doppler tornado radar scans |
| 2003-2011 | HAL | Hurricanes at Landfall | Gulf/Atlantic Coast | Hurricanes at landfall |
| 2004 | ROTATE-2004 | Radar Observations of Tornadoes and Thunderstorms Experiment | Great Plains | Dual-Doppler tornado radar scans |
| 2005 | ROTATE-2005 | Radar Observations of Tornadoes and Thunderstorms Experiment | Great Plains | Low level tornado radar scans and TIV guidance |
| 2009-2010 | VORTEX 2 | Verification of the Origins of Rotation in Tornadoes Experiment 2 | Great Plains | Tornadoes |

== Doppler on Wheels 6 ==
DOW 6
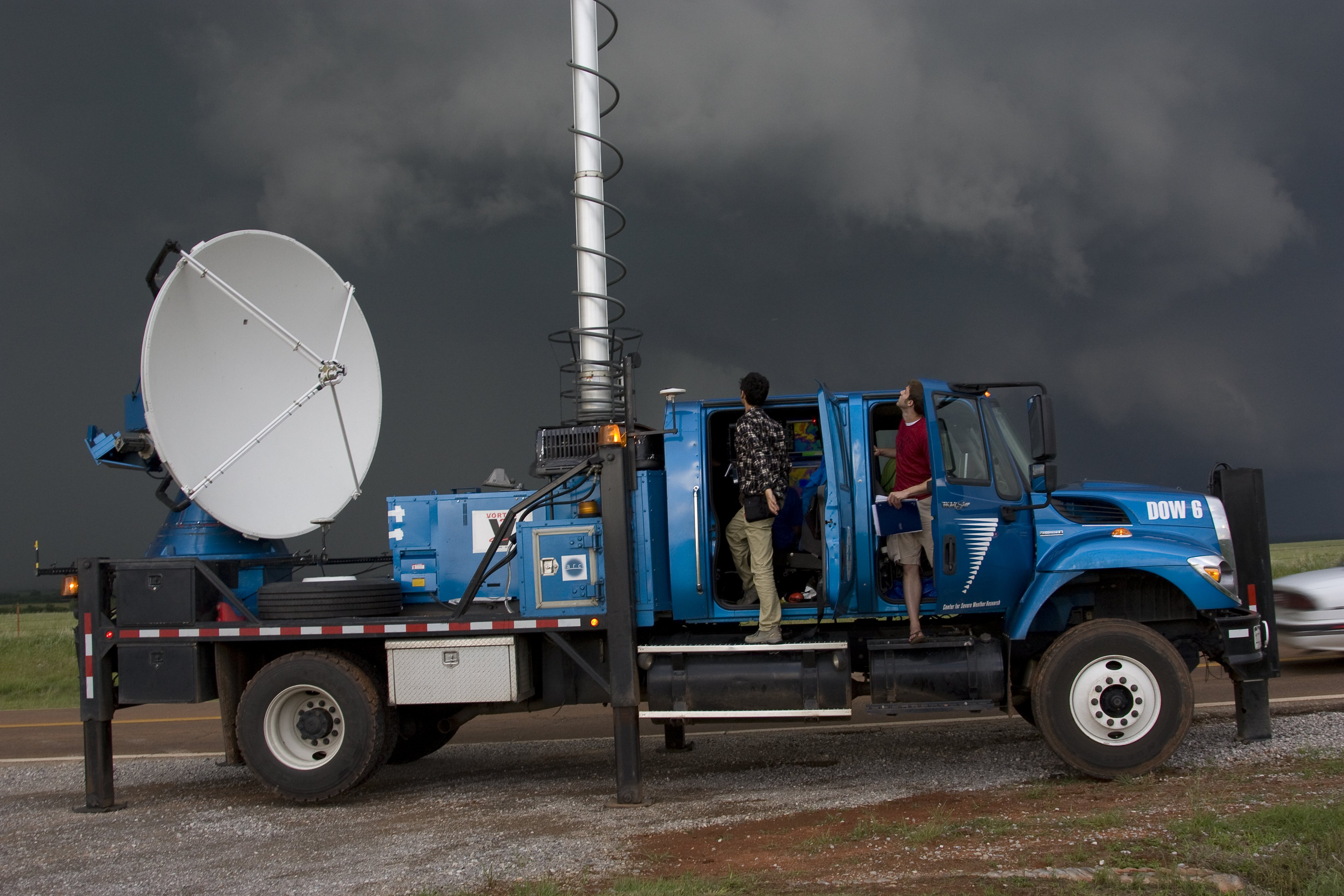
- Country of origin: USA
- Designer: Joshua Wurman
- Introduced: 2008
- No. built: 1
- Type: Weather Radar
- Frequency: X-band
- PRF: 500 - 6000 Hz (+stagger)
- Beamwidth: (3dB) 0.93°
- Pulsewidth: 0.167 – 1.0 μs
- RPM: 50 deg/s
- Diameter: 2.44 m
- Power: 2x 250 kW (Peak Tx Power)

Doppler on Wheels 6 (DOW 6) was introduced in 2008 to replace the two 2nd Generation Doppler on Wheels units (DOWs 2 and 3) in preparation for the VORTEX 2 research project in 2009 and 2010. DOW 6, along with DOWs 7 and 8, were built on 7500 series International Workstar Trucks, which are more powerful and rugged than the Ford F700 used for DOWs 2 and 3 or the 4300/4700 Workstar series used for other mobile radars including NOXP, MAX, and Smart-R. Mounted on the 7500 series, DOW 6 was able to reach peak speeds of 75 mph and boasted increased acceleration, allowing for faster deployment times.

After 17 years of successful deployments, DOW 6 was retired in 2025, having produced one of the most comprehensive mobile radar datasets in severe weather research history. DOW 6 was subsequently replaced by the next generation of Doppler on Wheels radar trucks, dubbed "DOW A" and "DOW B".

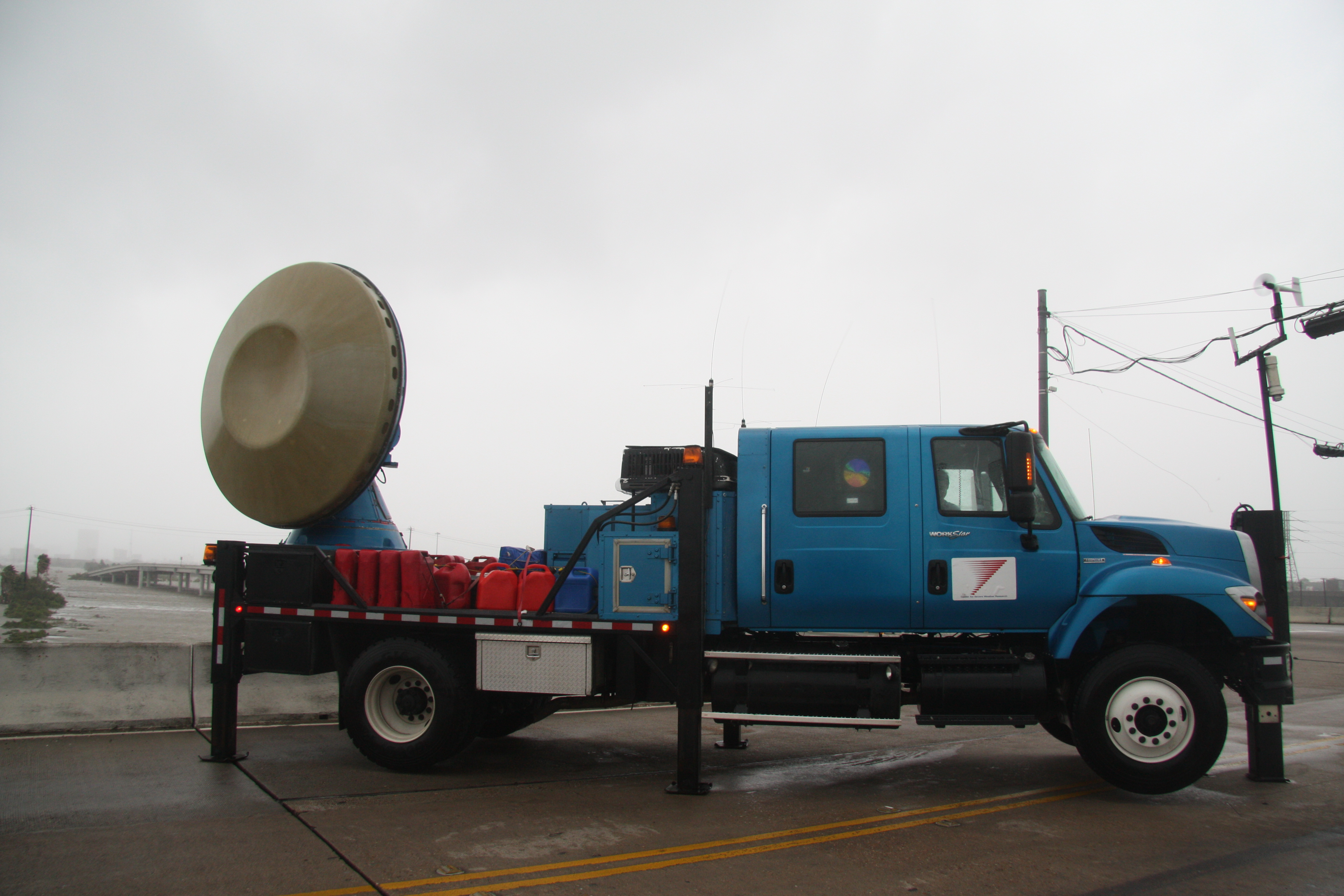
Doppler on Wheels 6 during a hurricane in 2009.

DOW 6 Radar Specifications
| Tx Power (Peak) | 2x 250 kW |
| Antenna Dimension | 2.44 m Parabolic |
| Beamwidth (3 dB) | 0.93° |
| Pulsewidth(μs) | 0.167 - 1.0 μs |
| Gatelength (m) | 12.5 – 600 m |
| PRF | 500 – 6000 Hz (+stagger) |
| Polarization | Dual-Frequency Dual-Polarization (H or V before being upgraded in 2010) |
| Processing | TITAN |
| Products | LDR, ZDR. ρHV, V, Z, SW, NCP, IQ |
| Antenna Scan Speed | 50 deg/s |
| Antenna Scan Modes | PPI, RHI, SUR, Solar |

DOW 6 Research Missions
| Year | Name | Full Name | Location | Focus |
|---|---|---|---|---|
| 2008 | ROTATE-2008 | Radar Observations of Tornadoes and Thunderstorms Experiment | Great Plains | Dual-Doppler tornado radar scans and probe deployments |
| 2008-2024 | HAL | Hurricanes at Landfall | Gulf/Atlantic Coast | Hurricanes at landfall |
| 2009-2010 | VORTEX 2 | Verification of the Origins of Rotation in Tornadoes Experiment 2 | Great Plains | Tornadoes |
| 2011 | ROTATE-2011 | Radar Observations of Tornadoes and Thunderstorms Experiment | Great Plains | Dual-Doppler tornado radar scans and probe deployments |
| 2012 | ROTATE-2012 | Radar Observations of Tornadoes and Thunderstorms Experiment | Great Plains | Dual-Doppler tornado radar scans and probe deployments |
| 2013 | ROTATE-2013 | Radar Observations of Tornadoes and Thunderstorms Experiment | Great Plains | Dual-Doppler tornado radar scans and probe deployments |
| 2013 | OWLeS | Ontario Winter Lake-effect Systems | New York | Lake effect storms |
| 2013 | Bristol Head | Bristol Head Fire | Colorado | Fire-scar flooding |
| 2014 | ROTATE-2014 | Radar Observations of Tornadoes and Thunderstorms Experiment | Great Plains | Dual-Doppler tornado radar scans and probe deployments |
| 2015 | Cape Cod | Cape Cod Snowpocalypse | Cape Cod | Snowbands |
| 2015 | PECAN | Plains Elevated Convection at Night | Great Plains | Nocturnal MCS |
| 2015-2016 | OLYMPEX | Olympic Mountain Experiment | Olympics | Orographic precipitation |
| 2015-2016 | MASCRAD | Multiple Angle Snow Camera-Radar Experiment | Colorado | Snowflake morphology |
| 2016 | TWIRL 2016 | Tornadic Winds: In-situ and Radar observation at Low levels | Great Plains | Tornadoes |
| 2017 | SNOWIE | Seeded Natural Orographic Wintertime Clouds: Idaho Experiment | Idaho | Orographic cloud seeding |
| 2017 | TWIRL 2017 | Tornadic Winds: In-situ and Radar observation at Low levels | Great Plains | Tornadoes |
| 2017 | Eclipse | Eclipse | Wyoming | Solar eclipse effect on BL |
| 2018 | TWIRL 2018 | Tornadic Winds: In-situ and Radar observation at Low levels | Great Plains | Tornadoes |
| 2018 | GRAINEX | The Great Plains Irrigation Experiment | Nebraska | Effect of irrigation on BL |
| 2018 | RELAMPAGO | Remote Sensing of Electrification, Lightning, And Mesoscale/microscale Processes with Adaptive Ground Observations | Argentina | Severe convection in Argentina |
| 2019 | TWIRL 2019 | Tornadic Winds: In-situ and Radar observation at Low levels | Great Plains | Tornadoes |
| 2021 | TWIRL 2021 | Tornadic Winds: In-situ and Radar observation at Low levels | Great Plains | Tornadoes |
| 2022 | WINTRE-MIX | Winter Precipitation Type Research Multi-scale Experiment | Northern New York and Southern Quebec | Project to study mixed precipitation in near-freezing environments and the multi-scale processes that influence precipitation type. |
| 2022-2023 | PERiLS | Propagation, Evolution and Rotation in Linear Storms | Southeast | QLCS Tornadoes |
| 2024 | BEST | Boundary-layer Evolution and Structure of Tornadoes | Great Plains | Tornadoes and boundary layer. |

== Doppler on Wheels 7 ==
DOW 7
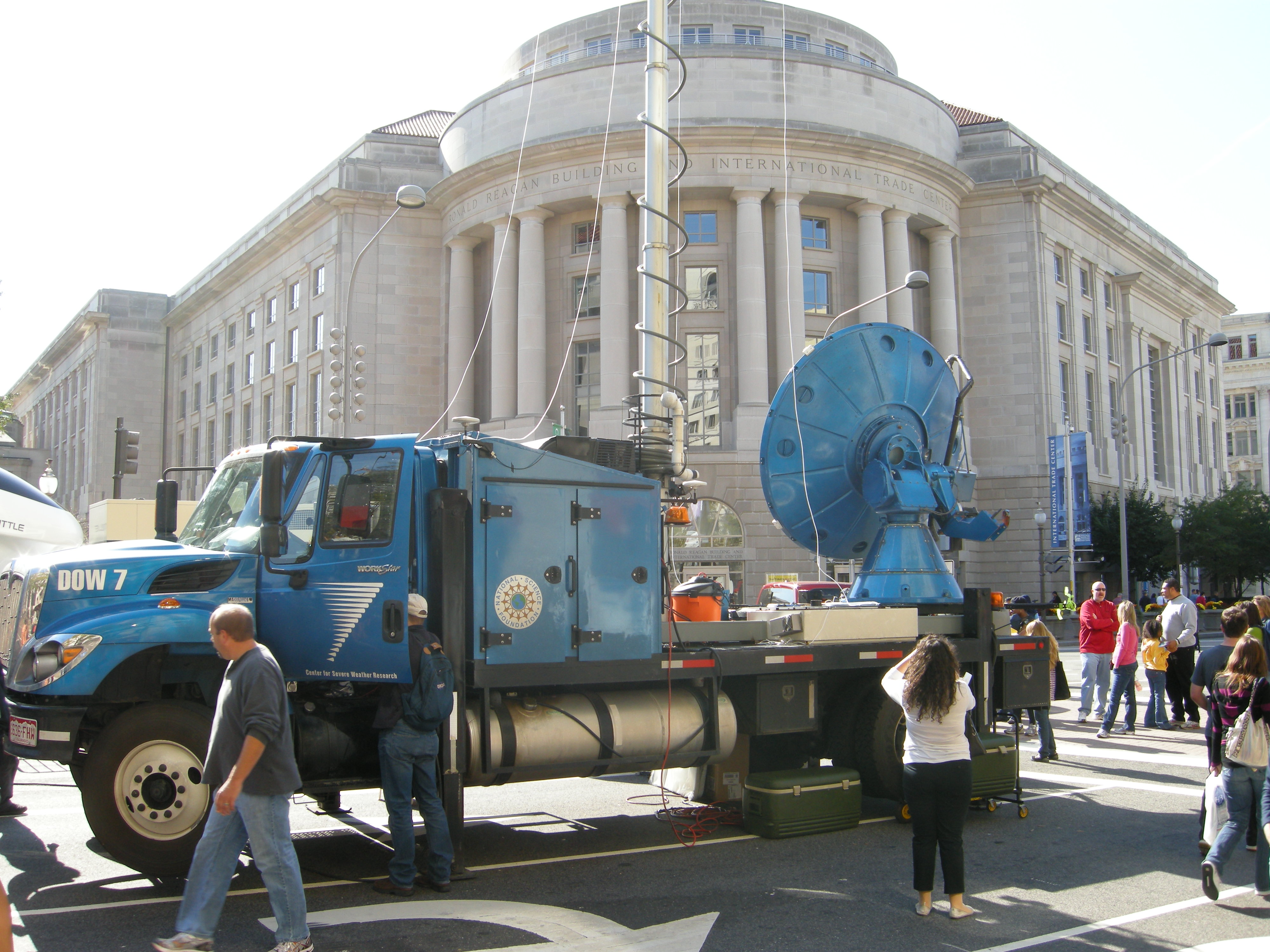
- Country of origin: USA
- Designer: Joshua Wurman
- Introduced: 2009
- No. built: 1
- Type: Weather Radar
- Frequency: X-band
- PRF: 500 - 6000 Hz (+stagger)
- Beamwidth: (3dB) 0.93°
- Pulsewidth: 0.167 – 1.0 μs
- RPM: 50 deg/s
- Diameter: 2.44 m
- Power: 2x 250 kW (Peak Tx Power)

DOW 7 reflectivity during VORTEX 2 Goshen County, WY tornado on June 5th, 2009.

Doppler on Wheels 7 (DOW 7) was introduced one year after DOW 6, in time for the start of the 2009 storm season and VORTEX 2 research project. Like DOW 6, it was built on a 7500 series International Workstar Truck and featured comparable radar and processing specifications. These differences were primarily present in 2009, where DOW 7 utilized a slightly lower pulselength of 150 - 2000 ns compared to DOW 6's 200 - 2000 ns pulselength. There were also some slight differences in the cabin design and layout, but these are negligible and had no impact on the radar's performance.

DOW 7 was retired at the end of 2024 to make way for the next generation of Doppler on Wheels radar trucks. These two new DOWs, named "DOW A" and "DOW B", made several improvements on DOWs 6 and 7 by improving ergonomics, field maintenance, reduced front-sector radar beam blockage, new computers, new transmitters, new antenna control, identical layouts, and new trucks.

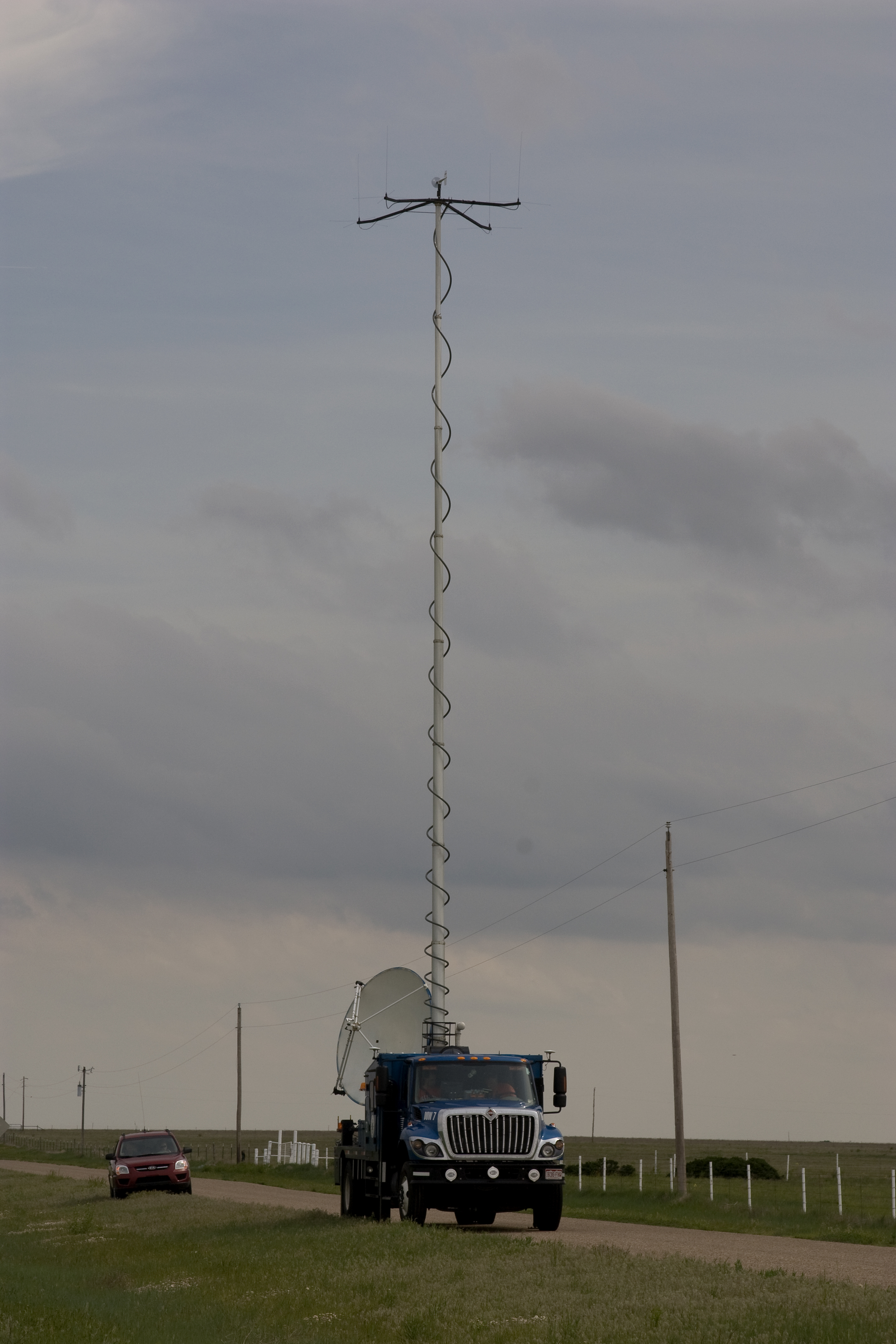
Doppler on Wheels 7 during 2010 VORTEX 2 Operations

DOW 7 Radar Specifications
| Tx Power (Peak) | 2x 250 kW |
| Antenna Dimension | 2.44 m Parabolic |
| Beamwidth (3 dB) | 0.93° |
| Pulsewidth(μs) | 0.167 - 1.0 μs |
| Gatelength (m) | 12.5 – 600 m |
| PRF | 500 – 6000 Hz (+stagger) |
| Polarization | Dual-Frequency Dual-Polarization (H or V before being upgraded in 2010) |
| Processing | TITAN |
| Products | LDR, ZDR. ρHV, V, Z, SW, NCP, IQ |
| Antenna Scan Speed | 50 deg/s |
| Antenna Scan Modes | PPI, RHI, SUR, Solar |

DOW 7 Research Missions
| Year | Name | Full Name | Location | Focus |
|---|---|---|---|---|
| 2008 | ROTATE-2008 | Radar Observations of Tornadoes and Thunderstorms Experiment | Great Plains | Dual-Doppler tornado radar scans and probe deployments |
| 2008-2024 | HAL | Hurricanes at Landfall | Gulf/Atlantic Coast | Hurricanes at landfall |
| 2009-2010 | VORTEX 2 | Verification of the Origins of Rotation in Tornadoes Experiment 2 | Great Plains | Tornadoes |
| 2010-2011 | LLAP | Long Lake Axis-Parallel lake effect storms | New York | Lake effect storms |
| 2010-2011 | ASCII | AgI Seeding of Clouds Impact Investigation | Wyoming | Orographic cloud seeding |
| 2011 | ROTATE-2011 | Radar Observations of Tornadoes and Thunderstorms Experiment | Great Plains | Dual-Doppler tornado radar scans and probe deployments |
| 2012 | ROTATE-2012 | Radar Observations of Tornadoes and Thunderstorms Experiment | Great Plains | Dual-Doppler tornado radar scans and probe deployments |
| 2013 | ROTATE-2013 | Radar Observations of Tornadoes and Thunderstorms Experiment | Great Plains | Dual-Doppler tornado radar scans and probe deployments |
| 2013 | OWLeS | Ontario Winter Lake-effect Systems | New York | Lake effect storms |
| 2013-2014 | Pawnee | Pawnee Grasslands | Colorado | Boundary layer |
| 2014 | ROTATE-2014 | Radar Observations of Tornadoes and Thunderstorms Experiment | Great Plains | Dual-Doppler tornado radar scans and probe deployments |
| 2015 | Cape Cod | Cape Cod Snowpocalypse | Cape Cod | Snowbands |
| 2015 | PECAN | Plains Elevated Convection at Night | Great Plains | Nocturnal MCS |
| 2016 | Nederland | Nederland Fire | Colorado | Fire |
| 2016 | TWIRL 2016 | Tornadic Winds: In-situ and Radar observation at Low levels | Great Plains | Tornadoes |
| 2017 | SNOWIE | Seeded Natural Orographic Wintertime Clouds: Idaho Experiment | Idaho | Orographic cloud seeding |
| 2017 | TWIRL 2017 | Tornadic Winds: In-situ and Radar observation at Low levels | Great Plains | Tornadoes |
| 2017 | Eclipse | Eclipse | Wyoming | Solar eclipse effect on BL |
| 2018 | TWIRL 2018 | Tornadic Winds: In-situ and Radar observation at Low levels | Great Plains | Tornadoes |
| 2018 | GRAINEX | The Great Plains Irrigation Experiment | Nebraska | Effect of irrigation on BL |
| 2018 | RELAMPAGO | Remote Sensing of Electrification, Lightning, And Mesoscale/microscale Processes with Adaptive Ground Observations | Argentina | Severe convection in Argentina |
| 2019 | TWIRL 2019 | Tornadic Winds: In-situ and Radar observation at Low levels | Great Plains | Tornadoes |
| 2020 | Colo Fires | Colorado Fires | Colorado | Fires |
| 2021 | TWIRL 2021 | Tornadic Winds: In-situ and Radar observation at Low levels | Great Plains | Tornadoes |
| 2022 | WINTRE-MIX | Winter Precipitation Type Research Multi-scale Experiment | Northern New York and Southern Quebec | Project to study mixed precipitation in near-freezing environments and the multi-scale processes that influence precipitation type. |
| 2022-2023 | PERiLS | Propagation, Evolution and Rotation in Linear Storms | Southeast | QLCS Tornadoes |
| 2022-2023 | LEE | Lake Effect Electrification | New York | Lake effect storms and lightning |
| 2024 | BEST | Boundary-layer Evolution and Structure of Tornadoes | Great Plains | Tornadoes |

== Doppler on Wheels 8 (Configurable Radar On Wheels) ==
The Configurable Radar On Wheels (CROW) was designed to be a versatile mobile radar platform able to change radars depending on the research project. It was first deployed in 2012 with a rapid scan phased array radar previously used on DOW 5, but was shortly thereafter upgraded to carry a single polarization X-Band radar used on DOW 2 and 6. In late 2024, the CROW was upgraded again to carry a 1.5 degree beam dual polarization C-band radar, similar to those mounted on SMART-R research vehicles. Like DOW's 6 and 7, the CROW is built on a 7500 series International Workstar Truck.

=== Single Polarization X-Band Configuration ===
DOW 8 Single Polarization
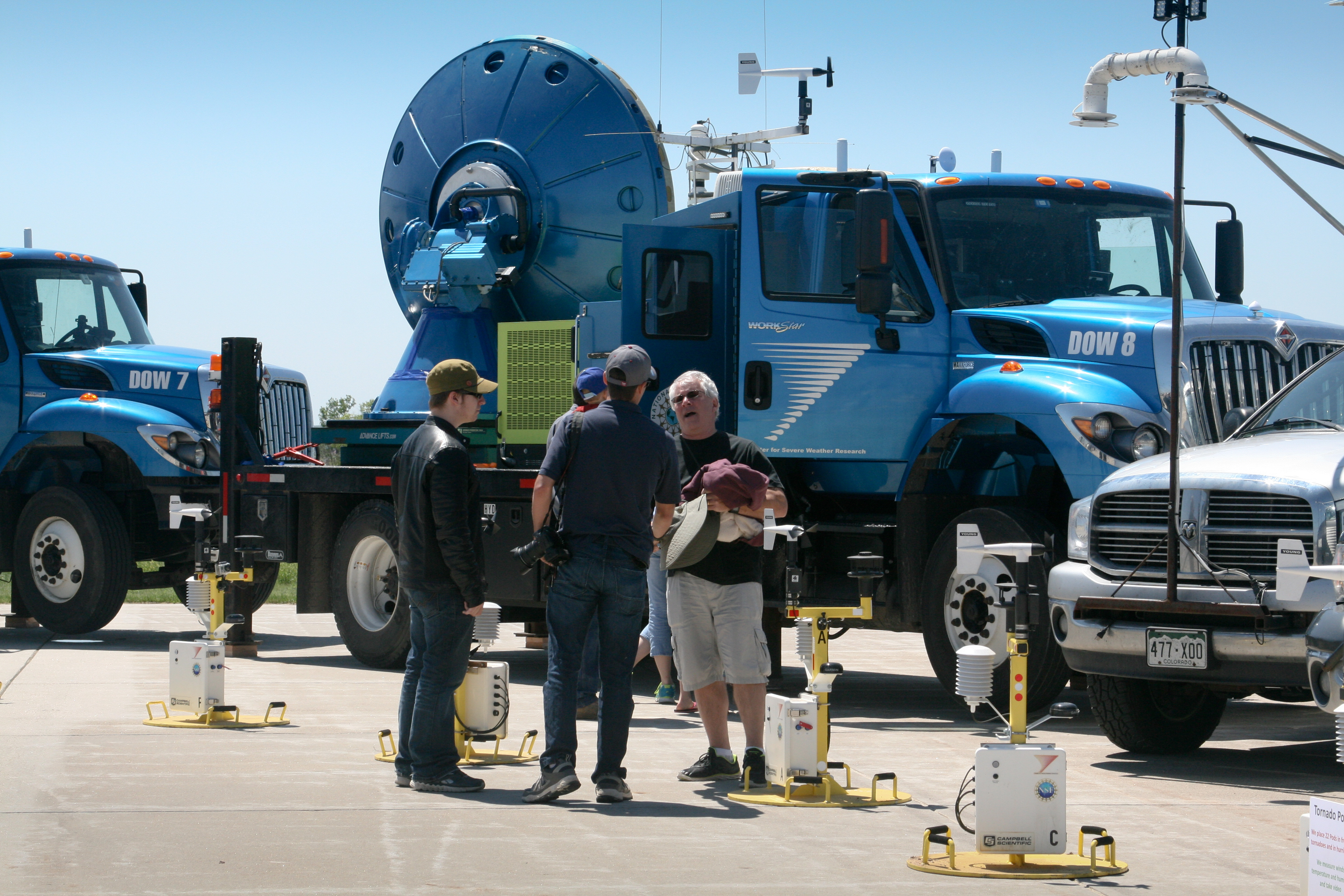
- Country of origin: USA
- Designer: Joshua Wurman
- No. built: 1
- Type: Weather Radar
- Frequency: X-band
- PRF: 500 - 6000 Hz (+stagger)
- Beamwidth: (3dB) 0.93°
- Pulsewidth: 0.167 - 1.0 μs
- Power: 250 kW (Peak Tx Power)

The Single Polarization configuration of DOW 8 utilizes the radar first fielded on DOW 2, which is only able to scan horizontally or vertically at a single time. Because of this, it uses a singular 250 kW generator to power the singular frequency used when scanning. While not as advanced as the dual polarization radars on DOWs A and B (previously 6 and 7), it is still incredibly valuable during research deployments and allows for the creation of a 3 X-band radar network that provides more extensive coverage and allows for dual doppler wind velocity analysis. This versatility has been utilized on several large NSF research projects, including Plains Elevated Convection at Night 2015 (PECAN), The Great Plains Irrigation Experiment 2018 (GRAINEX), Remote sensing of Electrification, Lighting, And Mesoscale/microscale Processes with Adaptive Ground Observations 2018 (RELAMPAGO), and Propagation, Evolution and Rotation in Linear Storms 2022 (PERiLS).

DOW 8 Radar Specifications
| Tx Power (Peak) | 250 kW |
| Antenna Dimension | 2.44 m Parabolic |
| Beamwidth (3 dB) | 0.93° |
| Pulsewidth (μs) | 0.1 - 2.0 μs |
| Pulselength (μs) | 0.167 - 1.0 μs |
| Gatelength | 12.5 - 300 (0.08 - 2 μs) |
| PRF | 500–6000 Hz (+stagger) |
| Polarization | H or V |
| Processing | TITAN |
| Products | V, Z, SW, NCP, IQ |
| Antenna Scan Speed | 0 - 50°s - 1 |
| Antenna Scan Modes | PPI, RHI, SUR, Solar |

DOW 8 Single-Pol Research Missions
| Year | Name | Full Name | Location | Focus |
|---|---|---|---|---|
| 2015 | PECAN | Plains Elevated Convection at Night | Great Plains | Nocturnal MCS |
| 2017 | TWIRL 2017 | Tornadic Winds: In-situ and Radar observation at Low levels | Great Plains | Tornadoes |
| 2018 | GRAINEX | The Great Plains Irrigation Experiment | Nebraska | Effect of irrigation on BL |
| 2018 | RELAMPAGO | Remote Sensing of Electrification, Lightning, And Mesoscale/microscale Processes with Adaptive Ground Observations | Argentina | Severe convection in Argentina |
| 2022 | PERiLS | Propagation, Evolution and Rotation in Linear Storms | Southeast | QLCS Tornadoes |

=== Rapid Scan Configuration ===
DOW 8 Rapid Scan
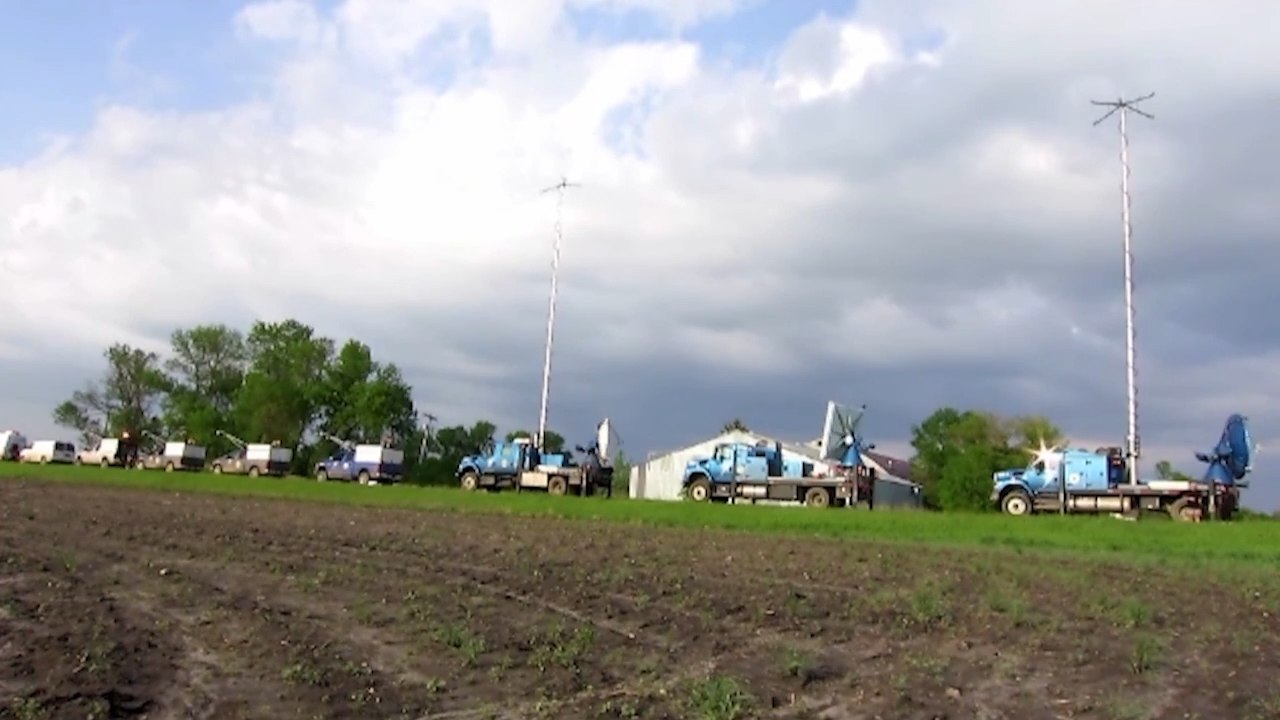
- Country of origin: USA
- Designer: Joshua Wurman
- Introduced: 2012
- No. built: 1
- Type: Weather Radar
- Frequency: 9.3-9.8 GHz (X-band)
- PRF: 500 - 6000 Hz (+stagger)
- Beamwidth: (3dB) 0.8°
- Pulsewidth: 0.1 - 1.0 μs
- Power: 40 kW (Peak Tx Power)
- Other names: RS DOW, Rapid Scan DOW

The DOW 8 Rapid Scan configuration utilizes the same radar used on DOW 5, but boasts an upgraded chassis and new processor, upgrading from the PIRAQ-3 to Thunderstorm Identification, Tracking, Analysis and Nowcasting (TITAN). It still maintains the frequency based, electronic vertical steering phased array radar that has a peak transmit power of 40 kW, but the radar is now mounted on a small elevator system. This elevator system allows for the radar and its pedestal to be raised while stationary, reducing radar beam blockage from the cabin.

DOW 8 Rapid Scan Radar Specifications
| Tx Power (Peak) | 40 kW |
| Phased Array Dimension | 2.4 m x 2.6 - 3.0 m |
| Beamwidth (3 dB) | 0.8° x 0.9° (6 beams, upgradable to 12) |
| Pulsewidth (μs) | 0.125 - 1.0 μs |
| Gatelength | 11 – 600 m (0.2 - 2 μs) |
| PRF | 500–6000 Hz (+stagger) |
| Polarization | H or V |
| Processing | TITAN |
| Products | V, Z, SW, NCP, IQ |
| Antenna Scan Speed | 0 - 50°s - 1 (7 second volumes) |
| Antenna Scan Modes | PPI, RHI, SUR, Solar |

DOW 8 Rapid Scan Research Missions
| Year | Name | Full Name | Location | Focus |
|---|---|---|---|---|
| 2012 | ROTATE-2012 | Radar Observations of Tornadoes and Thunderstorms Experiment | Great Plains | Dual-Doppler tornado radar scans and probe deployments |
| 2013 | ROTATE-2013 | Radar Observations of Tornadoes and Thunderstorms Experiment | Great Plains | Dual-Doppler tornado radar scans and probe deployments |
| 2013 | OWLeS | Ontario Winter Lake-effect Systems | New York | Lake effect storms |
| 2016 | TWIRL 2016 | Tornadic Winds: In-situ and Radar observation at Low levels | Great Plains | Tornadoes |

=== C-band Configuration ===
Mini-COW
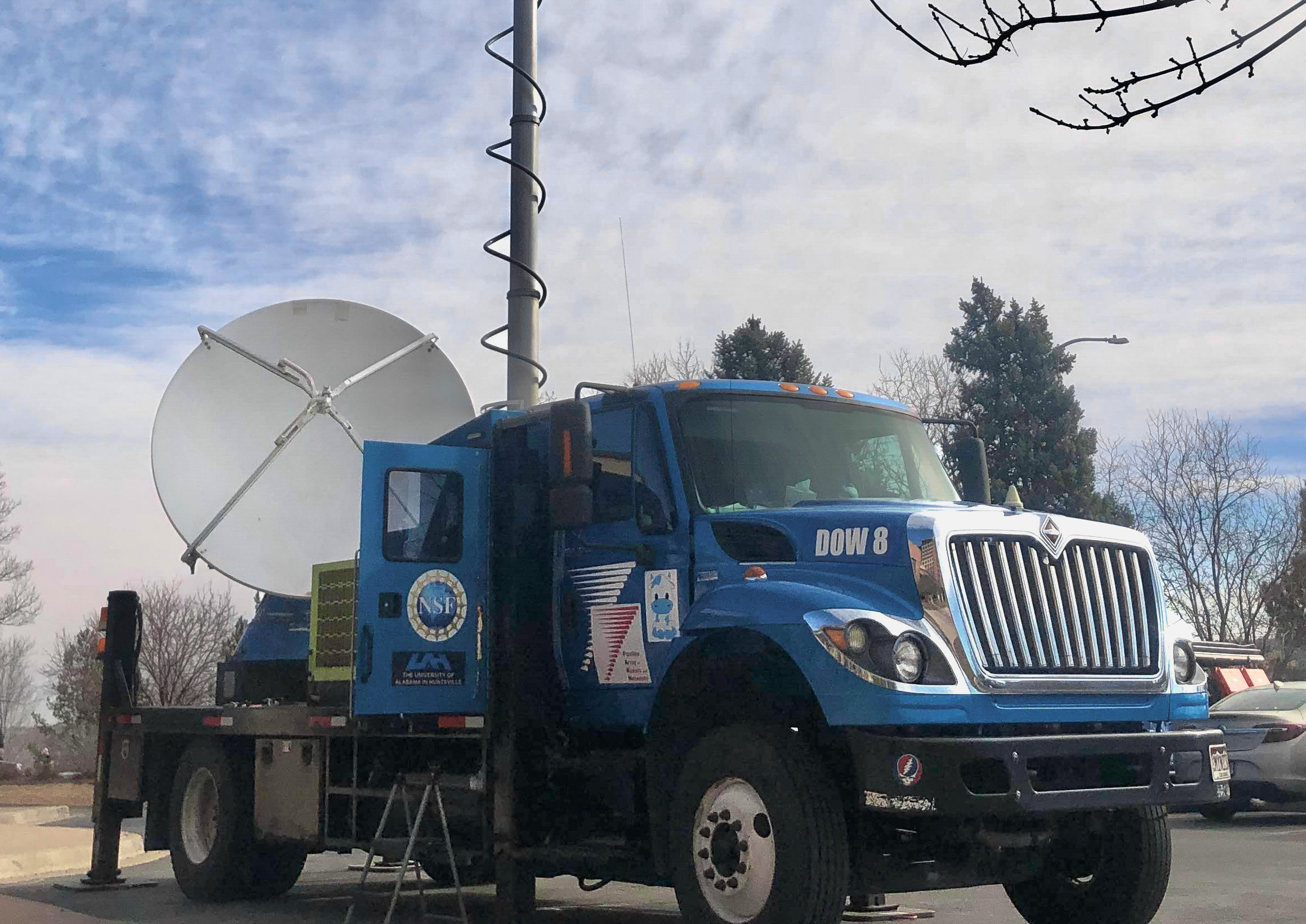
- Country of origin: USA
- Designer: Joshua Wurman
- Introduced: 2024
- No. built: 1
- Type: Weather Radar
- Frequency: C-band
- PRF: 500 - 6000 Hz (+stagger)
- Beamwidth: (3dB) 1.5°
- Pulsewidth: 0.15 - 1.0 μs
- Power: 1000 kW (Peak Tx Power)
- Other names: DOW 8 C-band, COW2

The Mini-COW configuration of DOW 8 was designed to fit a C-band radar on a Doppler on Wheels while also maintaining the maneuverability and short deployment times of the CROW and other X-band DOWs. C-band radars are useful because they serve as an intermediate frequency between S-bands and X-bands, gaining some of the benefits of each. C-band radars have longer ranges than X-band radars and are less susceptible to clutter, meaning they can scan through more precipitation and experience less attenuation degradation. However, C-band radars have lower overall resolution than X-band radars because of their longer wavelength. This makes C-band radars ideal for high precipitation events like hurricanes, mesoscale convective systems, squall lines, and supercells. When paired up with X-band DOWs and the larger COW, the FARM Facility can get a more comprehensive view of severe weather by having both smaller scale high frequency data and a better overall view of precipitation and velocity throughout an entire storm system.

Like the SMART-R mobile C-band radars, the Mini-COW utilizes a beamwidth of 1.5 degrees while also incorporating newer and more advanced technologies. These newer technologies allow for the Mini-COW to have a lower pulsewidth range of 0.15 - 1.0 μs compared to the 0.2 - 2.0 μs of SMART-R's 1 and 2, which gives the Mini-COW an overall higher resolution at the slight cost of range. This is compensated for by the Mini-COW having a significantly higher peak transmit power of 1 MW compared to the SMART-R's 250 kW, allowing for better precipitation penetration.

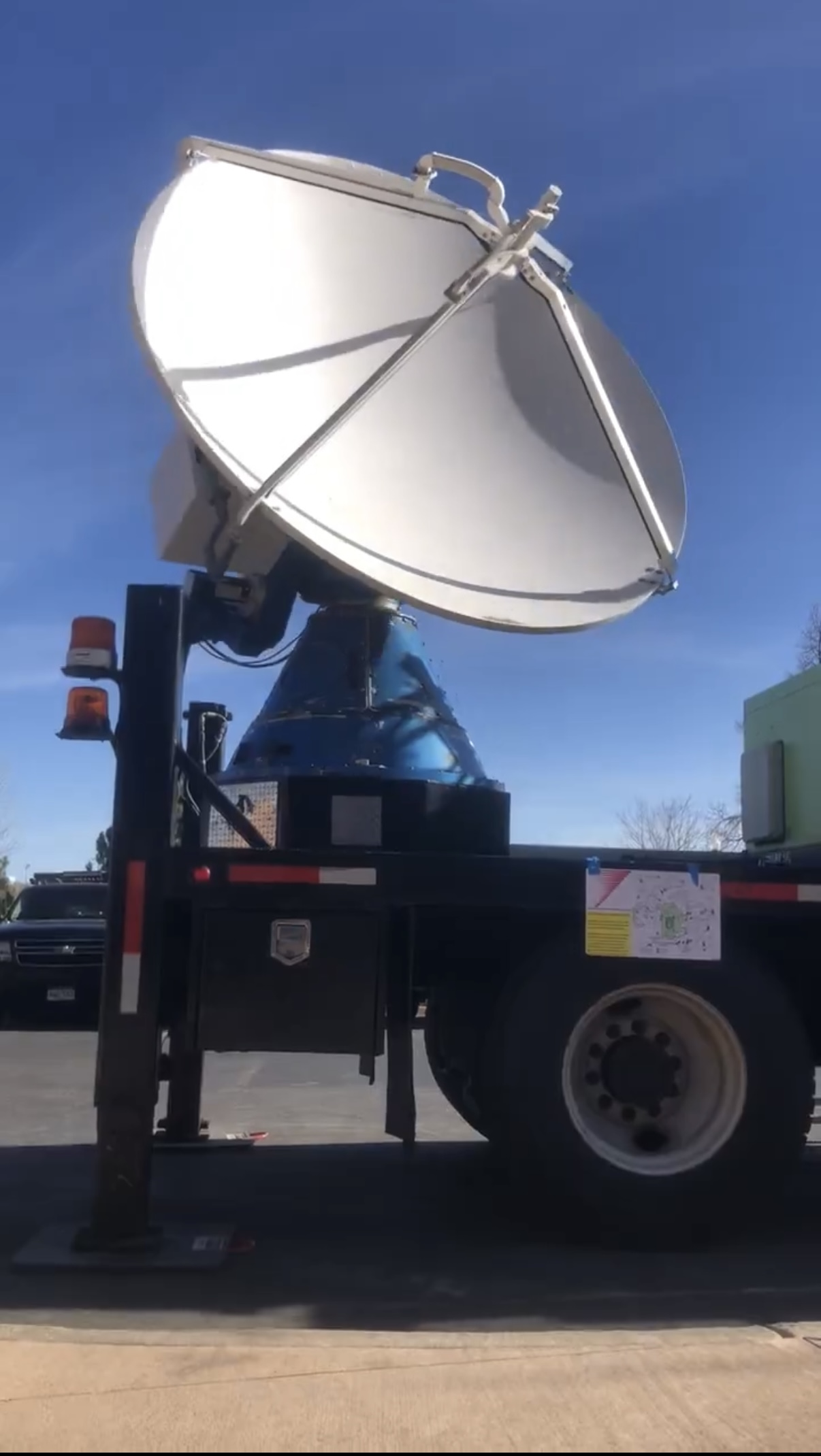
Mini-COW radar

Mini-COW Radar Specifications
| Tx Power (Peak) | 1000 kW |
| Antenna Dimension | Unknown |
| Beamwidth (3 dB) | 1.5° |
| Pulsewidth(μs) | 0.15 - 1.0 μs |
| Gatelength (m) | 12.5 – 600 m |
| PRF | 500 – 6000 Hz (+stagger) |
| Polarization | Dual-Frequency Dual-Polarization |
| Processing | TITAN |
| Products | ZDR. ρHV, V, Z, SW, NCP, IQ |
| Antenna Scan Speed | 50 deg/s |
| Antenna Scan Modes | PPI, RHI, SUR, Solar |

Mini-COW Research Missions
| Year | Name | Full Name | Location | Focus |
|---|---|---|---|---|
| 2025 | ICECHIP | In-situ Collaborative Experiment for the Collection of Hail In the Plains | Great Plains | Hail |

== C-band on Wheels ==
COW
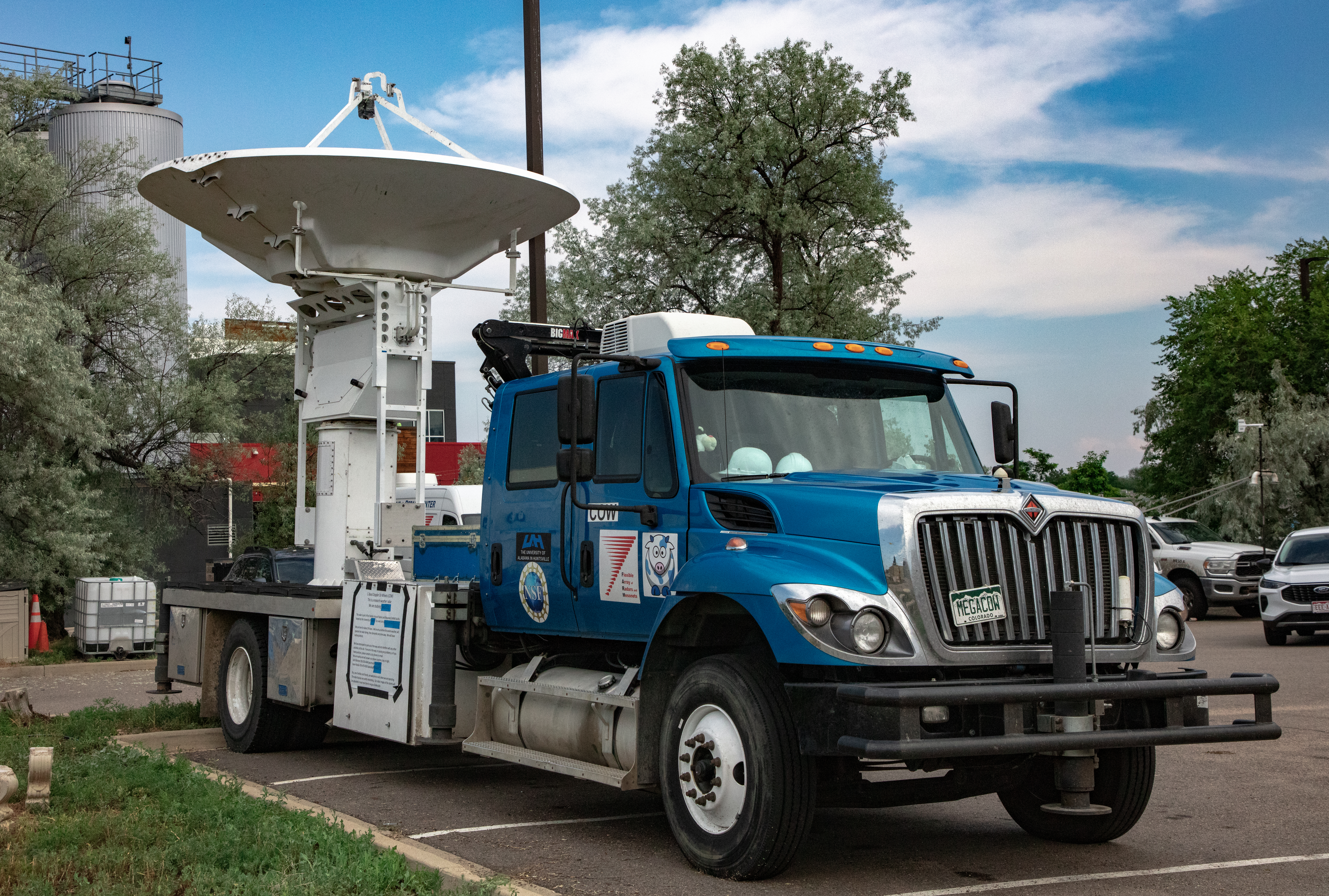
- Country of origin: USA
- Designer: Joshua Wurman
- Introduced: 2018
- No. built: 1
- Type: Weather Radar
- Frequency: C-band
- PRF: 500 - 6000 Hz (+stagger)
- Beamwidth: (3dB) 1°
- Pulsewidth: 0.167 – 1.0 μs
- RPM: 24 deg/s
- Power: 2x 1000 kW (Peak Tx Power)

The C-band on Wheels (COW) was completed in 2018 and designed to create a quickly deployable C-band platform that avoids compromises made by other mobile, quickly deployable (MQD) doppler radars. Traditional MQD radars use parabolic antennas smaller than 2.5 meters to fit under bridges and underpasses, meaning mobile radars are generally built to operate from 3 mm W-band wavelengths to 3 cm X-band wavelengths. Smaller wavelengths allow for the detection of smaller particles and higher resolutions, but are also much more susceptible to clutter, contamination, and attenuation. This forces them to operate at extremely close ranges, limiting deployment opportunities and increasing the chance of unsuccessful data collection missions, especially when studying high precipitation events like supercells. While several W-band and Ka-band mobile doppler radars exist, most notably the UMASS W-band and Texas Tech TTUKa (Ka-band), most MQD radars operate within the X-band because it still offers high-frequency performance while suffering from significantly less attenuation and can operate at longer ranges. X-band MQD radars include the DOW Network, NO-XP, MAX, RaXPol, UMass X-Pol, MWR-05XP, and Atmospheric Imaging Radar (AIR).

However, mobile X-band radars still suffer from attenuation, especially in high precipitation systems. This is most noticeable in areas behind the hail core and rear flanking downdraft. This can be addressed by using mid-band radars, which have longer wavelengths that are able to penetrate deeper through precipitation. The problem with using mid-band radars for MQD platforms is that they generally require antennas longer than 2.5 m to maintain high resolutions comparable to those of X-band radars. SMART-R mobile radars chose to compromise overall resolution by fitting a 2.4 m parabolic antenna that has a beamwidth of 1.6 degrees, but those compromises created resolution volumes over 2.5 times larger than those produced by X-band radars with 0.93 degree beamwidths.

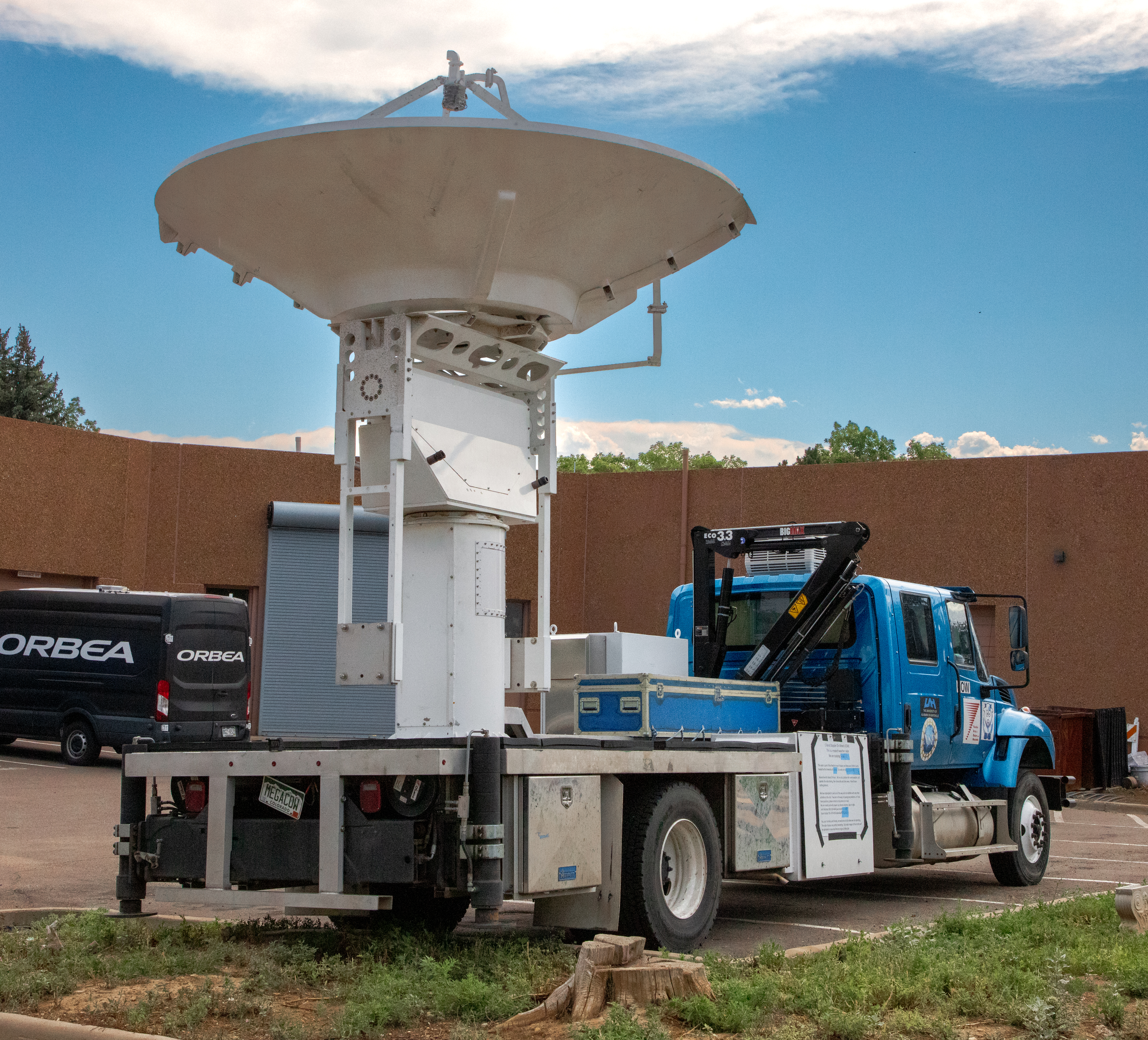
Rear view of C-band radar

COW Radar Specifications
| Tx Power (Peak) | 2x 1000 kW |
| Antenna Dimension | 3.8 m Parabolic |
| Beamwidth (3 dB) | 1.05° |
| Pulsewidth (μs) | 0.167 - 1.0 μs |
| Gatelength | 12.5 - 600(0.08 - 2 μs) |
| PRF | 500–6000 Hz (+stagger) |
| Polarization | dual-frequency, dual-polarization |
| Processing | TITAN |
| Products | LDR, ZDR, ρHV, V, Z, SW, NCP, IQ |
| Antenna Scan Speed | 0 - 24°s - 1 |
| Antenna Scan Modes | PPI, RHI, SUR, Solar |

To avoid making compromises in resolution like the SMART-R, the COW chose to use a 3.8 m parabolic antenna that is powered by a pair of 1 MW generators. This allows for the COW to have high resolution and high precipitation penetration at long ranges, but comes at the COW's ability to move once deployed. The COW's dish and antenna are split in half while being transported, and need to be assembled and disassembled during and after each deployment. This is done with a built in crane, and requires several people operating the COW to help construct and place the antenna onto the pedestal. The process takes 2 hours to set up and another 2 hours to disassemble, meaning it takes a 4 hours in total to deploy. This limitation means the COW can usually be deployed only once per day, but the benefits from large radar allow the COW to fill niches that were previously impossible for quickly deployable radars.

=== COW deployment strategies ===
The COW's long range dual polarized radar with a narrow beamwidth of 1.05 degrees makes it ideal for targeted studies where the radar changes locations between IOPs, longer period stationary deployments, and even allows it to serve as a gap filling radar. During the PERiLS project, which was a targeted study of QLCS tornadoes that required the COW to change locations every IOP, the radar operated with a scan radius of ~90 km (180 km diameter) and paired with other mobile radars to create a broad radar array network. Because of their greater range and less susceptibility to attenuation, C-band radars made up the backbone of the radar network. The COW operated as the central radar, with 2 SMART-R radars being spaced 35 km from the central COW. Higher frequency X-band radars, consisting of DOW 6, DOW 7, NO-XP, MAX, and occasionally DOW 8, functioned as baseline extenders for the SMART-R radars, especially in areas with poor site suitability. The X-band radars were spaced 25 km apart from each other and the SMART-Rs. This setup, enabled by the COW, allowed for high resolution radar data across a large geographic area in a way that would previously not be possible.

COW Research Missions
| Year | Name | Full Name | Location | Focus |
|---|---|---|---|---|
| 2018 | RELAMPAGO | Remote Sensing of Electrification, Lightning, And Mesoscale/microscale Processes with Adaptive Ground Observations | Argentina | Severe convection in Argentina |
| 2022 | WINTRE-MIX | Winter Precipitation Type Research Multi-scale Experiment | Northern New York and Southern Quebec | Project to study mixed precipitation in near-freezing environments and the multi-scale processes that influence precipitation type. |
| 2022-2023 | PERiLS | Propagation, Evolution and Rotation in Linear Storms | Southeast | QLCS Tornadoes |
| 2025 | ICECHIP | In-situ Collaborative Experiment for the Collection of Hail In the Plains | Great Plains | Hail |

== Capabilities ==
Doppler on Wheels B in 2026.

As of February 2026, the FARM Facility operates a fleet of four Doppler on Wheels radar trucks, consisting of DOW A, DOW B, the CROW with X-band, rapid scan, and C-band configurations, and the COW. These radar trucks are complimented by a fleet of three mobile mesonets, which are pickup trucks equipped with weather instrumentation able to measure wind, temperature, and relative humidity at a height of 3.5 meters. The trucks are also able to carry and deploy up to five “pods”, which are weather stations designed to measure temperature, wind speed, relative humidity, and temperature in extreme weather conditions such as hurricanes and tornadoes. The FARM Facility also owns five GRAW radiosonde launch systems, which are weather balloons able to collect temperature and humidity soundings at different levels of the atmosphere. These are complimented by several disdrometers, which collect precipitation measurements and are able to verify radar observations from the DOWs. To support large research projects, FARM sometimes operates the Mobile Operations and Repair Center (MORC), a van which houses computer workstations and repair facilities.

There are currently two major projects planned to expand the FARM's capabilities. The first is the creation of an S-band on Wheels Network (SOWNET) featuring four quickly-deployable S-band radars with 10 cm wavelengths capable of seeing through intense precipitation. These smaller truck-mounted radars would replace a single large S-band radar, allowing for dual-Doppler analyses and quicker deployment times. The second planned project is the Bistatic Adaptable Radar Network (BARN) which will be integrated with existing DOWs and the COW to provide high resolution wind vector observations without the need for multiple, expensive transmitters. These bistatic receivers will consist of small antennas that can be deployed like Pods or mounted onto a Mobile Mesonet or similar vehicle.

== Findings ==
DOW data led to the discovery of sub-kilometer hurricane boundary layer rolls, which likely modulate wind damage and may play a key role in hurricane intensification. DOW data revealed some of the most intense tornadic winds ever recorded (the Bridge Creek–Moore tornado, 3 May 1999, the El Reno tornado, 31 May 2013, and the Greenfield, Iowa Tornado, 21 May 2024), and the largest tornadic circulation ever documented (the Cimarron City–Mulhall–Perry Tornado, which also occurred on 3 May 1999), and made the first 3D maps of tornado winds and sub-tornadic vortex winds, and documented intense vortices within lake-effect snow bands. About 70 peer-reviewed scientific publications have used DOW data.

DOW data has led to the discovery of the descending reflectivity core, a microscale phenomenon that may aid in tornadogenesis.

== Gallery ==
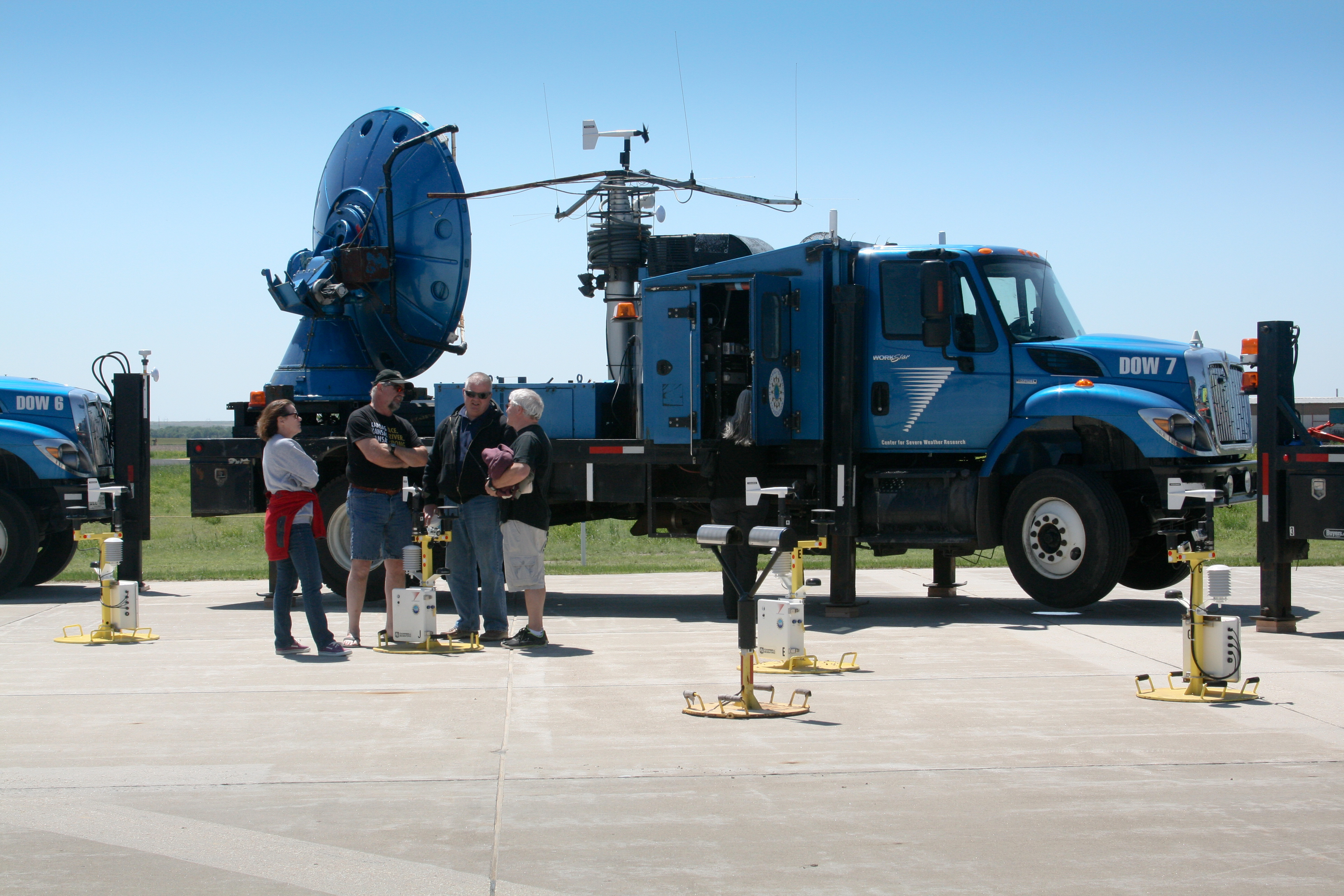
DOW 7 at PECAN 2015

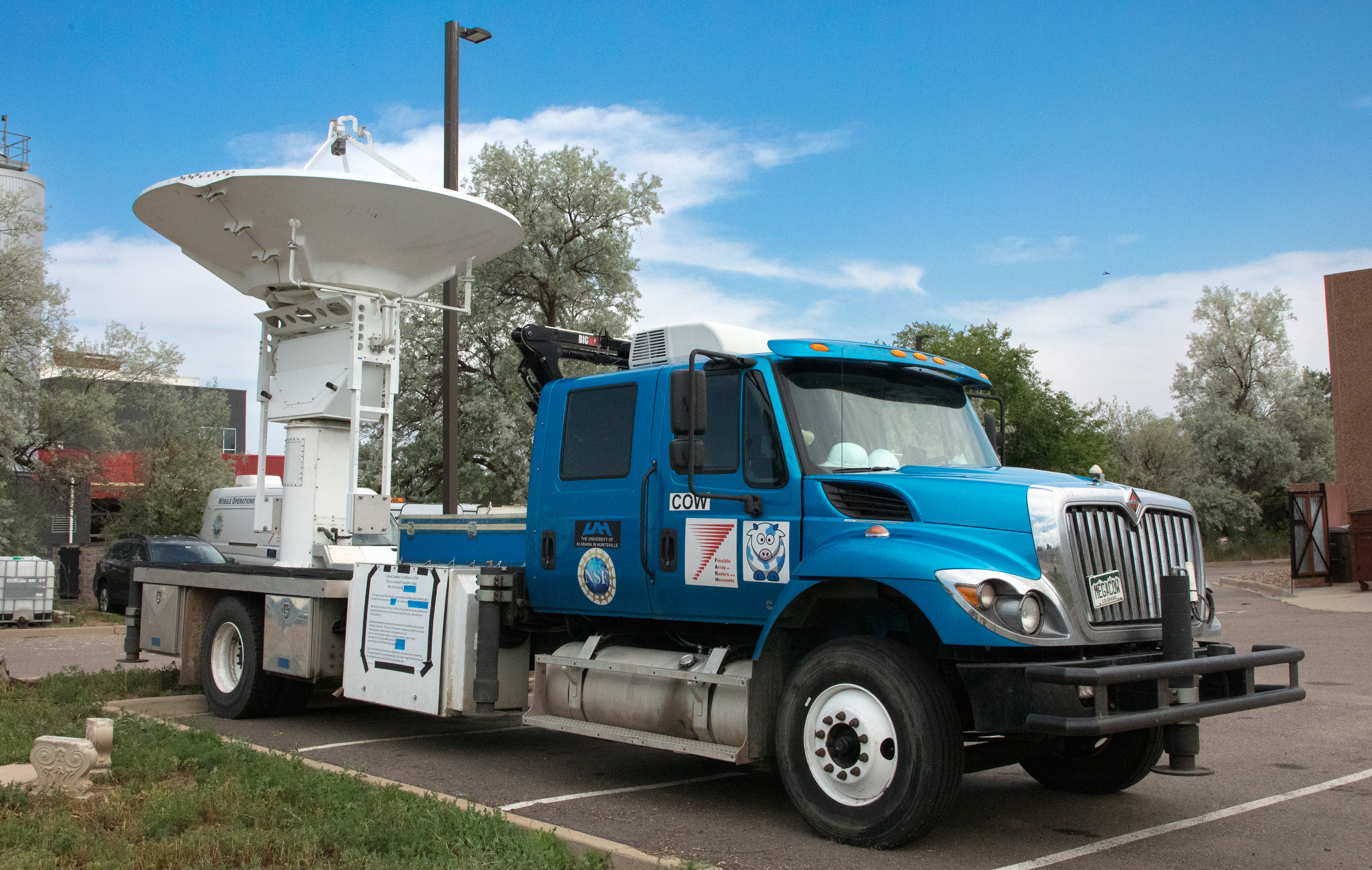
C-Band on Wheels

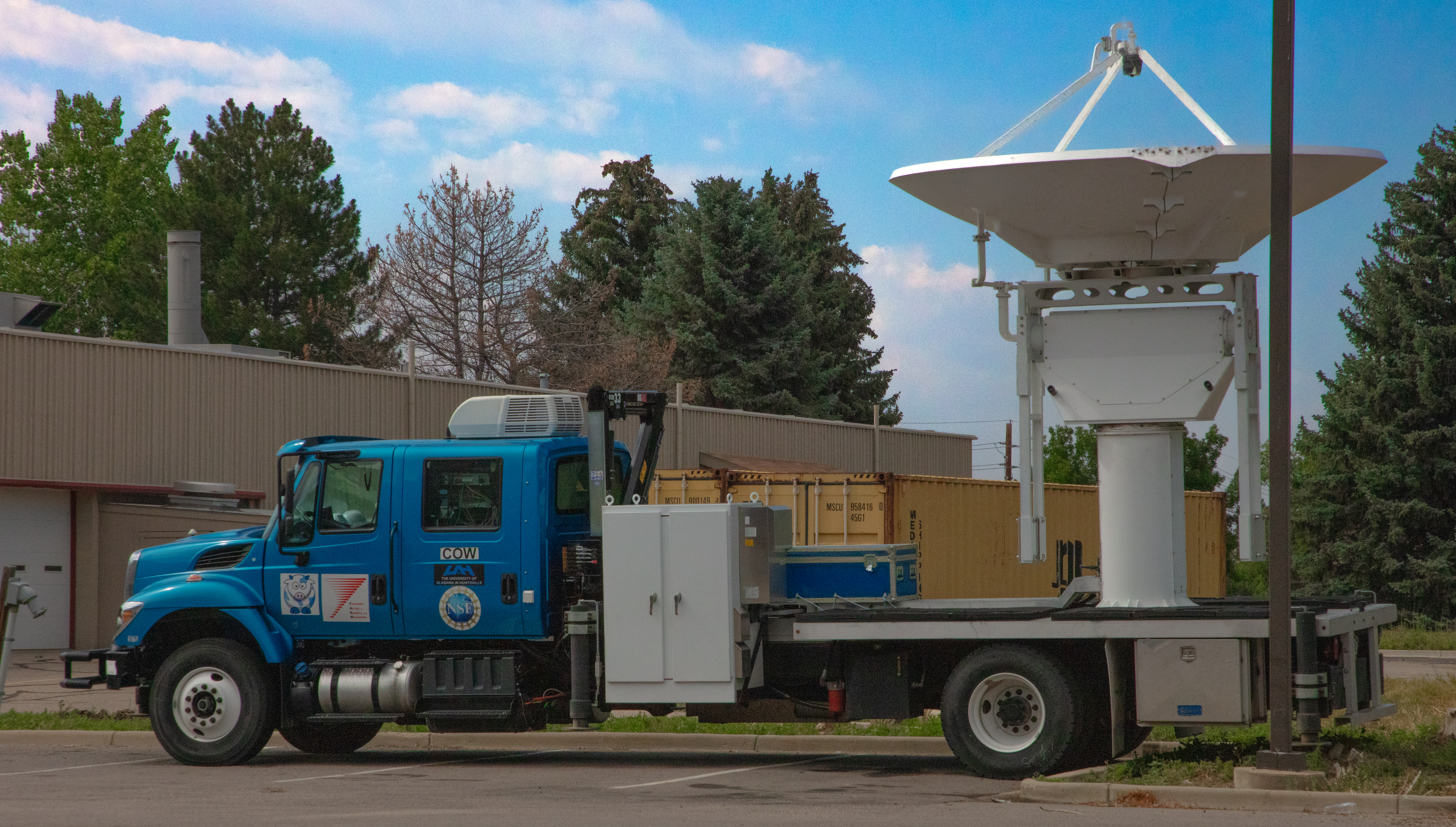
C-Band on Wheels Generator

== See also ==
- Mobile radar observation of tornadoes
- Bistatic radar
- Pulse-Doppler radar
- Storm chasing
- Joshua Wurman
- Karen Kosiba
