= List of tornadic researchers =

This is a list of notable people who researched tornadoes.

== Living ==
Name of person	Research on tornadoes
Howard Bluestein	Co-inventor of the TOtable Tornado Observatory (TOTO); A principal investigator for the VORTEX2 Project; Author of the 1993 book Severe Convective Storms and Tornadoes: Observations and Dynamics; Author of the 1999 book Tornado Alley: Monster Storms of the Great Plains
Chris Broyles	Tornado forecasting expert; Issuing the first and second-ever Day 2 High Risk Outlooks; Led a team of twenty others to create the National Oceanic and Atmospheric Administration's Violent Tornado webpage, which documented more than 200 tornado outbreaks throughout the United States' history.
Donald W. Burgess	Scientist on VORTEX and VORTEX2 Projects; Worked at the National Severe Storms Laboratory (NSSL) as a research meteorologist and made major contributions to the NEXRAD Doppler radar program, especially concerning severe storms and tornadoes.; Led the team that developed the tornadic vortex signature (TVS) and also pioneered development of the concept of nowcasting as he used radar at NSSL in directing research teams to intercept severe and tornadic storms.
Thomas P. Grazulis	Regarded as a "tornado expert".; Worked for the Nuclear Regulatory Commission (NRC) to create a historical tornado database along with Ted Fujita and the National Severe Storms Forecast Center.; Published numerous books and databases on tornadoes including Significant Tornadoes, 1880-1989, Significant Tornadoes, 1680-1991, and Significant Tornadoes 1974–2022.; Produced several tornado documentaries including Twister: Fury on the Plains and Twister: Nature's Fury; Created the Outbreak Intensity Score (OIS), as a way to rank tornado outbreaks.
Karen Kosiba	One of the leading scientists on the PERiLS Project.; On May 21, 2024, she operated a Doppler on Wheels mobile radar while observing the Greenfield, Iowa EF4 tornado.; She led the FARM project aside meteorologist Joshua Wurman.
Anthony Lyza	"Expert" on tornadoes; Physical Sciences Coordinator for the VORTEX-USA Project; Coordinating Scientist on the PERiLS Project; Lead author of the EF5 drought study published in 2025; Lead author of the 2019 Greenwood Springs tornado case study; Lead author of the 2014 Kankakee Valley tornado cluster case study
Timothy P. Marshall	Expert structural and forensic engineer, meteorologist, and expert on tornadoes and tornado damage.; One of the lead creators of the Enhanced Fujita scale.; Marshall has conducted more than 100 damage surveys of hailstorms, tornadoes, and hurricanes. Some of the famous tornadoes he surveyed include the F5s/EF5s at Jarrell, Texas (1997), Bridge Creek, Oklahoma (1999), Greensburg, Kansas (2007), Alabama (2011), Joplin, Missouri (2011), Moore, Oklahoma (2013), and the EF4 Western Kentucky tornado in 2021. Some of the famous hurricanes he has surveyed include Alicia in Texas (1983), Hugo in South Carolina (1989), Andrew in Florida (1992), Opal in Florida (1995), Katrina in Mississippi (2005), and Ike in Texas (2008).; Was selected by the National Oceanic and Atmospheric Administration to serve on their Quick Response Team (QRT) where he has surveyed tornado damage in Alabama and Georgia in 1994, Nashville, Tennessee in 1998, La Plata, Maryland in 2002, Parkersburg, Iowa in 2008, the 2011 Super Outbreak, the 2011 Joplin tornado, and the 2015 Dallas-Ft. Worth Metroplex tornadoes.; Principal trainer in damage surveys for the National Weather Service.; Participated in the VORTEX2 Project.; Editor and writer for Storm Track (1986–2002).; Authored numerous academic publications, books, and produced numerous DVDs.
Leigh Orf	An "expert on severe thunderstorms, tornadoes, and using supercomputers to simulate the atmosphere". Won the IDC/Hyperion High Performance Computing Innovation Excellence Award in 2014 and 2016.
Erik N. Rasmussen	The field coordinator of the first of the VORTEX projects in 1994-1995 and a lead principal investigator for VORTEX2 from 2009-2010 and VORTEX-SE from 2016-2017.
Robin Tanamachi	Worked on the VORTEX projects from 2015 to 2021.
Reed Timmer	Meteorologist and storm chaser who has filmed numerous tornadoes, including the 1999 Bridge Creek–Moore tornado, a year after his first tornado filmed, the 2011 Philadelphia, Mississippi and Tuscaloosa–Birmingham tornadoes, which were included in the 2011 Super Outbreak, and the 2013 El Reno tornado, an EF3 tornado which he was injured in. In 2022, he chased and filmed the eyewall of Category 5 Hurricane Ian.; Starred in the Discovery Channel reality television series Storm Chasers.; Starred in the documentary film Tornado Glory.; Created and maintains the SRV Dominators.; Launched a rocket probe into an EF4 tornado on May 28 near Lawrence, Kansas to collect data of the tornado-producing supercell and the tornado itself, which he called "incredible".; Filmed JAW-DROPPING Tornado Drone Footage Shows Kansas Town Get Ripped Apart, which is a video of the 2022 Andover tornado, from a drone operated by Timmer. This video has become one of the most notable videos in the field of meteorology.
Joshua Wurman	Inventor of the Doppler on Wheels, which has observed numerous tornadoes.; Wurman is in the USA Science and Engineering Festival's Nifty Fifty, a collection of the most influential scientists and engineers in the United States that are dedicated to reinvigorating the interest of young people in science and engineering.

== Deceased ==
Name of person	Research on tornadoes
Cleveland Abbe	"Old Probability"; First director of the United States Weather Bureau
Frank Hagar Bigelow	Created Bigelow's Formula, which was to find the rotational speed of a tornado based on the height above sea level.
Charles A. Doswell III	Lead forecaster for the first project VORTEX in 1994/1995, produced more than 100 refereed publications, and several contributions to books and encyclopedias. He edited the American Meteorological Society (AMS) monograph Severe Convective Storms as well as co-authored two papers there.
John Park Finley	First American to extensively study tornadoes. He also wrote the first known book on the subject as well as many other manuals and booklets, collected vast climatological data, set up a nationwide weather observer network, started one of the first private weather enterprises, and opened an early aviation weather school.
Ted Fujita	Creator of the Fujita scale; "Mr. Tornado"; Developed the concept of multiple vortex tornadoes, which feature multiple small funnels (suction vortices) rotating within a larger parent cloud. His work established that, far from being rare events as was previously believed, most powerful tornadoes were composed of multiple vortices. He also advanced the concept of mini-swirls in intensifying tropical cyclones.<ref">Dorschner, John (22 August 1993). "One year later, Andrew's scars remain". Pittsburgh Post-Gazette. ISSN 1068-624X – via Newspaper.com. "Fujita found winds within winds within winds. Mini-swirls and microburts and swatchs danced madly within the powerful eye wall, smashing some neighborhoods, then skating away, leaving other subdivisions with comparatively little damage."</ref>
Gottlob Burchard Genzmer	German Lutheran theologian, tutor and naturalist who conducted the first ever tornado damage survey for the 1764 Woldegk tornado. His damage surveys ultimately led to the European Severe Storms Laboratory rating the first and only T11 tornado on the TORRO scale.
J. J. O'Donnell	Published a detailed meteorological case study and damage analysis on the 1898 Fort Smith tornado.; One of the first to observed and measure a pressure drop from a hitting tornado.; Known for recorded the order-of-sequence of what an approaching tornado sounds like: "a gurgling noise...like water rushing rushing out of a bottle, followed immediately by a rumbling, such as that made by a number of heavy carriages rolling rapidly over a cobblestone pavement, and finally like a railroad train." O'Donnell later stated these three sounds, in sequence is the "tornado roar". This sequence of sounds documented by O'Donnell, particularly the sound of a train, is the described sound of a tornado by people, even in the 21st century.
Floyd C. Pate	Conducted case study on the 1945 Montgomery tornado. Pate described the tornado as "the most officially observed one in history", as it passed 2 miles (3.2 km) away from four different government weather stations, including the U.S. Weather Bureau office in Montgomery.
Tim Samaras	Founder of a field research team called Tactical Weather Instrumented Sampling in Tornadoes EXperiment (TWISTEX).; Samaras designed and built his own weather probes, and deployed them in the path of tornadoes in order to gain scientific insight into the inner workings of a tornado. With one such in-situ probe, he captured the largest drop in atmospheric pressure ever recorded, 100 hPa (mb) in less than one minute, when an F4 tornado struck one of several probes placed near Manchester, South Dakota, on June 24, 2003. The accomplishment is listed in Guinness World Records as the "greatest pressure drop measured in a tornado". The probe was dropped in front of the oncoming tornado a mere 82 seconds before it hit. The measurement is also the lowest pressure (adjusted for elevation) ever recorded at Earth's surface, 850 hectopascals (25.10 inHg).; Coauthored the 2009 book Tornado Hunter: Getting Inside the Most Violent Storms on Earth.; Was killed while chasing the 2013 El Reno tornado.
Józef Karol Skrodzki	Polish scientist and professor at the University of Warsaw, who wrote a paper describing a tornado that occurred in Mazew, Łęczyca County in Poland on August 10, 1819. It was described that the tornado had the appearance of a funnel whose color seemed different depending on the lighting, and that it damaged several buildings by tearing off roofs, damaging the structure, and lifting a hay wagon into the air. The paper was published in a collection of works by the Warsaw Society of Friends of Learning in 1821.
Carl Young	Scientists on the TWISTEX team who was killed in the 2013 El Reno tornado.
