= David Dowell =

American atmospheric scientist

- Education: Texas A&M University (B.S., 1991); University of Oklahoma (M.S., 1994; Ph.D., 2000)
- Known for: Tornado and meteorological data assimilation research
- Scientific career
- Fields: Meteorology
- Workplaces: NSSL, NCAR, CIMMS, ESRL

David C. Dowell is American atmospheric scientist recognized for research on tornado structure and dynamics and on tornadogenesis. He participated in both of the VORTEX projects.

Dowell studied computer science at Texas A&M University (TAMU), earning a B.S. summa cum laude in 1991 with a minor in meteorology. He was awarded a M.S. and a Ph.D. in meteorology from the University of Oklahoma (OU) in 1994 and 2000, respectively. He was on the steering committee, was a principal investigator (PI), and was field coordinator (FC) for the VORTEX2 field project in 2009-2010. Dowell is a Fellow of the Cooperative Institute for Mesoscale Meteorological Studies (CIMMS) at OU. He was a contributor to Storm Track magazine.

== See also ==
- Howard Bluestein
- Erik N. Rasmussen
- Louis Wicker
- Joshua Wurman
