= 2009 Goshen County tornado =

EF2 tornado in 2009

- An image of the tornado, with a mobile radar truck observing it.

Meteorological history
- Formed: June 5, 2009, 3:40 p.m. CDT (UTC−05:00)
- Dissipated: June 5, 2009, 5:03 p.m. CDT (UTC−05:00)
- Duration: 1 hour, 23 minutes

EF2 tornado
- on the Enhanced Fujita scale
- Highest winds: Official intensity: >118 mph (190 km/h); Radar-estimated: 161 mph (259 km/h) (as measured by Doppler on Wheels (DOW)

Overall effects
- Fatalities: 0
- Injuries: 0
- Areas affected: Goshen County, Wyoming
- Part of the Tornadoes of 2009

In the afternoon hours of June 5, 2009, a well-documented tornado moved across Goshen County, located in the state of Wyoming. The tornado was observed by hundreds of experimental radar instruments, and the event formed the pinnacle of the VORTEX projects, which aimed to document the formation and lifecycle of a tornado. The tornado and the observations of it were heavily studied by meteorologists in the following years, and footage of the tornado has been featured on several national television networks, including The Weather Channel.

== Tornado summary ==
The hook echo and associated mesocyclone of the tornado.

On the afternoon of June 5, a large tornado was observed by researchers with the VORTEX 2 tornado research project in Goshen County, Wyoming, with the entire life cycle of the tornado being broadcast live on The Weather Channel as part of their coverage of the VORTEX2 project. The tornado was on the ground for approximately 25 minutes and became rain-wrapped at one point, eventually roping out and dissipating. The tornado stayed in open rural areas and damaged only a few trees and telephone poles, leading to its rating of EF2 on the Enhanced Fujita scale. This tornado was also featured on an episode of the Discovery Channel series Storm Chasers, wherein the TIV 2 and the SRV Dominator both managed to penetrate the tornado with TIV 2 filming IMAX footage from inside the funnel.

=== Formation ===
Doppler weather radar positioned near the now-developed tornado recorded a rapid intensification over a period of three minutes, from 4:04 to 4:08. A decrease in convergence to the north of the tornado was also noted at around the same time.

== Documentation ==
=== Prior observation preparations ===
In the hours leading up to the tornado, multiple researchers working with the VORTEX2 team set up numerous instruments along U.S. Highway 85, including a doppler weather radar. By the time all of the instruments were set up, the hook echo of the supercell was located 21 miles (34 km) to the southwest. The Doppler radar was activated a minute later, and began to detect a mesocyclone, and several minutes later convergence lines were also detected.

=== Observations ===
A Doppler on Wheels observed the entire lifecycle of the tornado in Goshen County, Wyoming. The radar also observed a peak wind speed of 161 mph (259 km/h) at 15–20 m (49–66 ft) above the ground level. However, these winds occurred over open land, and the tornado was only rated an EF2 based on the damage observed.

== See also ==
- Disagreements on the intensity of tornadoes
- Mobile radar observation of tornadoes
- 2013 El Reno tornado – similar tornado that was observed by mobile radar to be far stronger than observed.
- May 2009 derecho series, a derecho that would take place in the United States a month earlier

== Notes and footnotes ==
=== Sources ===
- Kosiba, Karen; Wurman, Joshua; Richardson, Yvette; Markowski, Paul (April 1, 2013). "Genesis of the Goshen County, Wyoming, Tornado on 5 June 2009 during VORTEX2". American Meteorological Society.
- Kosiba, K. A.; Richardson, Y.P. (November 5, 2014). "Observations from VORTEX2: The intensification of the Goshen County, Wyoming tornado (05 June 2009)". American Meteorological Society.
- Wakimoto, Roger M.; Wurman, Joshua; Atkins, Nolan T. (July 1, 2011). "The LaGrange Tornado during VORTEX2. Part I: Photogrammetric Analysis of the Tornado Combined with Single-Doppler Radar Data". American Meteorological Society.
- Marquis, James; Richardson, Yvette; Markowski, Paul; Dowell, David (February 1, 2014). "An Investigation of the Goshen County, Wyoming, Tornadic Supercell of 5 June 2009 Using EnKF Assimilation of Mobile Mesonet and Radar Observations Collected during VORTEX2. Part I: Experiment Design and Verification of the EnKF Analyses". American Meteorological Society: 530–554.
- Supinie, Timothy A .; Jung, Youngsun; Xue, Ming; Stensrud, David J. (January 1, 2016). "Impact of VORTEX2 Observations on Analyses and Forecasts of the 5 June 2009 Goshen County, Wyoming, Supercell". American Meteorological Society.

=== Further reading ===
- "Goshen County, WY Tornado (5 June 2009)". Illinois.edu.
- Markowski, Paul; Richardson, Yvette; Marquis, James; Davies-Jones, Robert (September 1, 2012). "The Pretornadic Phase of the Goshen County, Wyoming, Supercell of 5 June 2009 Intercepted by VORTEX2. Part II: Intensification of Low-Level Rotation". American Meteorological Society.
