= Katharine Kanak =

American meteorologist

Katharine M. Kanak
- Education: University of Oklahoma (B.S., 1987); University of Wisconsin–Madison (M.S., 1990); University of Oklahoma (Ph.D., 1999)
- Known for: Dust devils on Earth and Mars; Idealized thermal convection; Tornadoes and supercells; Mammatus clouds; Hailstorms
- Awards: University of Wisconsin-Madison: Schwerdtfeger Award and Lettau Award. University of Oklahoma: Graduate Teaching Award
- Scientific career
- Fields: Meteorology
- Workplaces: University of Oklahoma, School of Meteorology/ CIMMS (now CIWRO)
- Thesis: On the Formation of Vertical Vortices in the Atmosphere (1999)
- Doctoral advisor: Douglas K. Lilly; John T. Snow

Katharine M. Kanak is an American atmospheric scientist known for her research on the dynamics and morphologies of atmospheric vortices, including convective boundary layer vortices, such as dust devils, both terrestrial and Martian. Kanak was one of the first to apply large eddy simulation of convective boundary layers to simulate the development of dust-devil-like vertical vortices arising from the convective pattern itself. Her dust-devil expertise was sought for media interviews and articles including the Deseret News in "Utah a Dust-Devil Haven" and Natural New England Magazine in "Unusual Photo of 'dust devil' snapped in Maine."

Other vortices she has studied include supercell storms, tornadoes, and tropical cyclones. She has also published papers on mammatus clouds and simulations, Rayleigh-Bénard convection, idealized thermal convective bubbles, hailstorms, microphysical parameterization schemes, and numerical techniques.

Kanak has contributed to major field campaigns including serving as the Assistant Field Coordinator for Project VORTEX in 1994–1995, participating in mobile mesonet operations in STEPS in 2000, and serving as a co-principal investigator for VORTEX2 in 2009-2010., the latter of which was at that time, the largest-scale tornado field program ever conducted.

== Education ==
Kanak earned a Bachelor of Science degree in meteorology with a minor in mathematics from the University of Oklahoma in 1987, where she completed an undergraduate research project on colliding thunderstorm outflows with Kelvin K. Droegemeier. At the University of Wisconsin–Madison, she completed an M.S. in meteorology in 1990 with Gregory J. Tripoli. Her M.S. thesis, Three-Dimensional, Non-Hydrostatic Numerical Simulation of a Developing Tropical Cyclone, was awarded the Heinz Lettau Award for outstanding M.S. thesis that year.

She returned to the University of Oklahoma and was awarded a Ph.D. in 1999 under the supervision of Douglas K. Lilly and John T. Snow. Her doctoral dissertation, On the Formation of Vertical Vortices in the Atmosphere, investigated the linear stability of convection in a Beltrami mean shear and the numerical simulation of dust-devil-like vortices in a quiescent convective boundary layer.

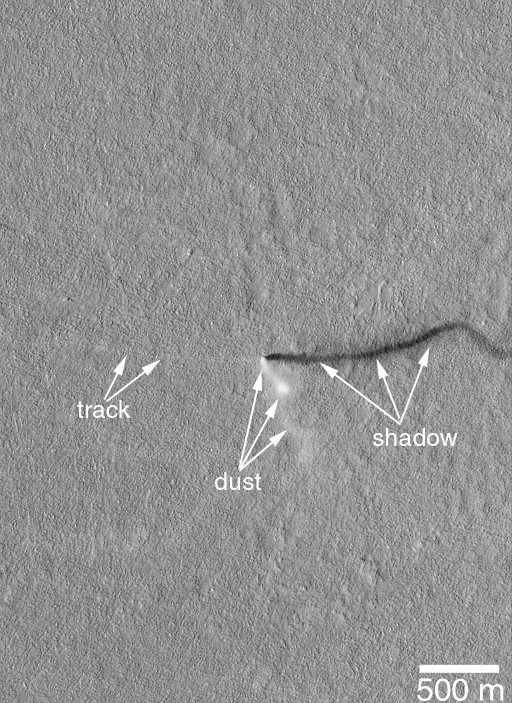
Martian dust devil as seen from orbit

== Career and research ==
Kanak has held research positions at the University of Oklahoma as a Research Scientist at the Cooperative Institute for Mesoscale Meteorological Studies (CIMMS; now the Cooperative Institute for Severe and High-Impact Weather Research and Operations CIWRO) and the University of Oklahoma School of Meteorology. She was also an Adjunct Associate Professor in the University of Oklahoma School of Meteorology.

Her research has included numerical simulation of convective vortex formation spanning many scales, from meters-wide ellipsoidal thermal bubbles, to dust-devils, to hurricanes. She developed a three-dimensional non-hydrostatic large eddy simulation model to study dust devils on Earth and Mars. Her 2005 paper on 2-m large eddy simulation of dust-devil-like vortices was one of the most cited in the Quarterly Journal of the Royal Meteorological Society that year. She was also a co-author, along with Bruce Cantor and Kenneth Edgett, on one of the early papers that surveyed dust devils observed by Mars Global Surveyor Mars Orbital Camera and discussed theoretical vortex models as applied to Martian vortices.

Other research includes that concerning mammatus clouds. Kanak and her co-authors published the first known numerical simulations of mammatus clouds in which they explored the clouds' formation and dynamics, with and without background wind shear.

== Teaching and mentorship ==
Kanak has taught and mentored atmospheric science students including co-advising and serving on committees for M.S. theses on numerical simulation of thermal convection, supercell storms, and hurricanes. She also taught classes on atmospheric thermodynamics, atmospheric physics, and mesoscale meteorology, and developed course material content for a class on severe and unusual weather. She was awarded a Graduate Student Teaching Assistant Award at OU.

== See also ==
- VORTEX projects
- Jerry Straka
- Erik N. Rasmussen
