= TORUS Project =

- Targeted Observation by Radars and UAS of Supercells Project
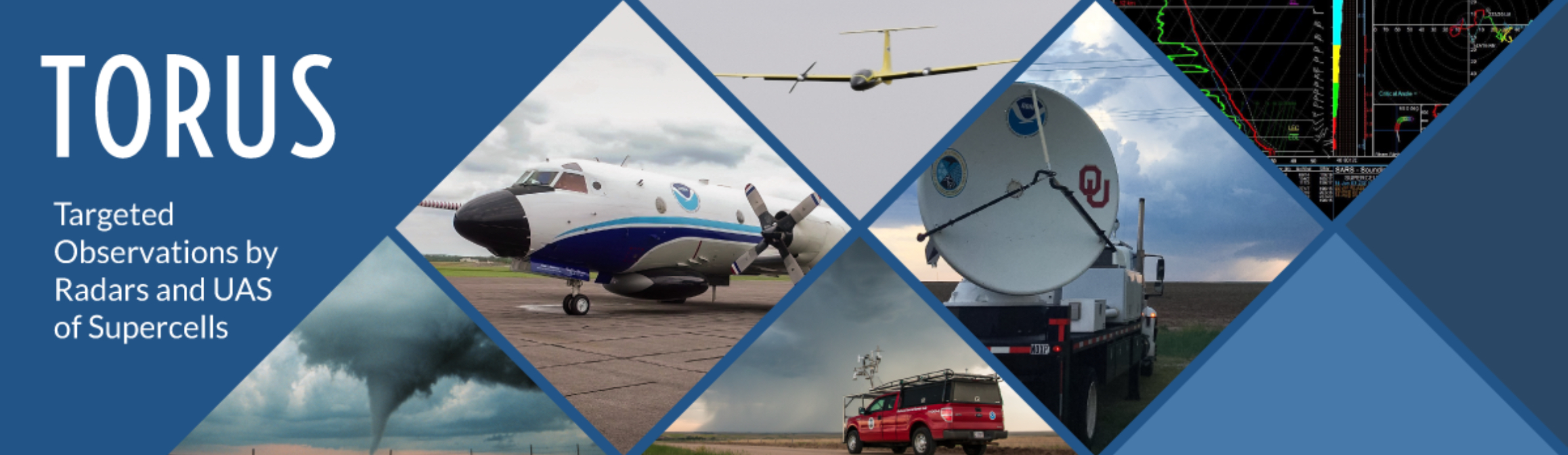
- U.S. government-created banner for TORUS Project
- Formation: May 16, 2019; 7 years ago
- Dissolved: May 16, 2023; 3 years ago
- Type: Government–academic research organization
- Headquarters: University of Nebraska–Lincoln
- Budget: $2.4 million (USD)
- Funding: National Science Foundation and NOAA

The Targeted Observation by Radars and UAS of Supercells Project, often shorted to the TORUS Project or just TORUS, is a United States federal government funded meteorological field research project to study various aspects of tornadoes, thunderstorms, and supercells.

The TORUS Project involved over 50 researches from the University of Nebraska–Lincoln (UNL), the National Severe Storms Laboratory (NSSL), the Office of Marine and Aviation Operations (OMAO), the University of Oklahoma (OU), the Cooperative Institute for Severe and High-Impact Weather Research and Operations (CIWRO), Texas Tech University (TTU), and the University of Colorado Boulder (CU). The TORUS Project was funded by the National Science Foundation (NSF) and the National Oceanic and Atmospheric Administration (NOAA). The TORUS Project covers over 367,000 square miles (950,000 km^{2}), stretching from North Dakota to Texas.

== Equipment ==
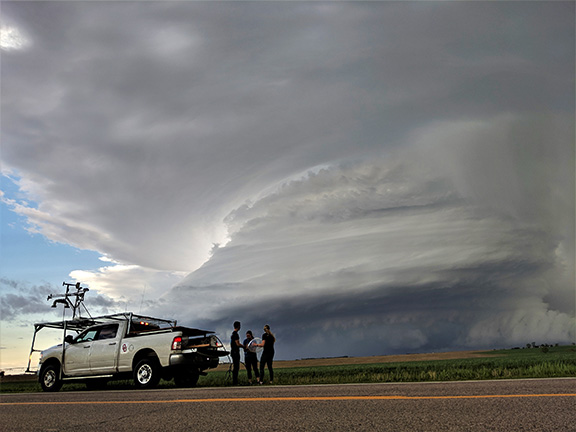
A NSSL Mobile Mesonet Truck team launching a weather balloon

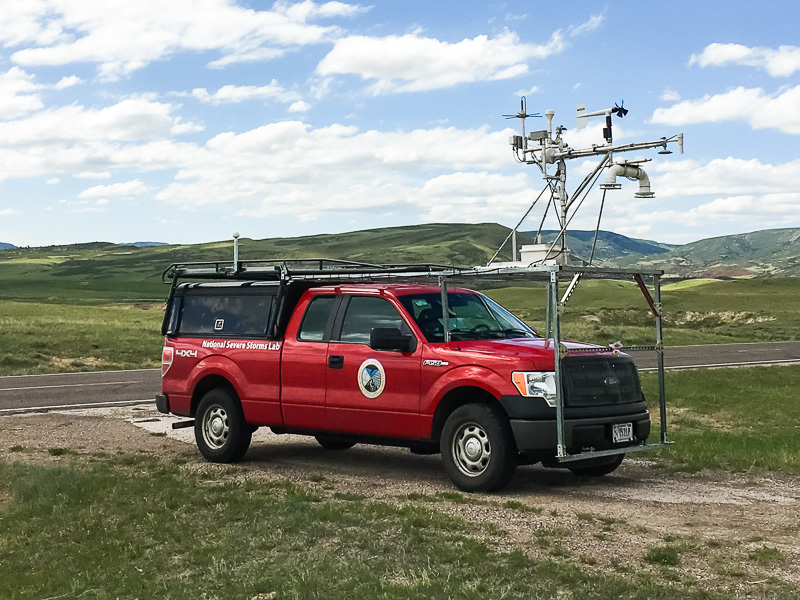
A mobile mesonet system operating under the NOAA's NSSL in 2017

The TORUS Project used several different research equipment items:

- 4 Unmanned aircraft systems (UAS)
- 2 Ka band mobile radars from Texas Tech University (TTU).
- 9 NSSL Mobile Mesonet Trucks
- 1 X band mobile radar from NSSL and OU (NOXP)
- 1 NSSL Mobile Sounding System
- 2 Radiosonde swarms
- 1 NSSL Mobile LIDAR system
- 1 NOAA Hurricane Hunters's P-3 Orion aircraft

== Project results ==
The results of the TORUS Project have been published in numerous academic papers, included several to the American Meteorological Society. A drone in the TORUS program was featured in the trailer for Twisters.

== See also ==
- List of United States government meteorology research projects
