= Robert Davies-Jones =

British atmospheric scientist

Bob Davies-Jones
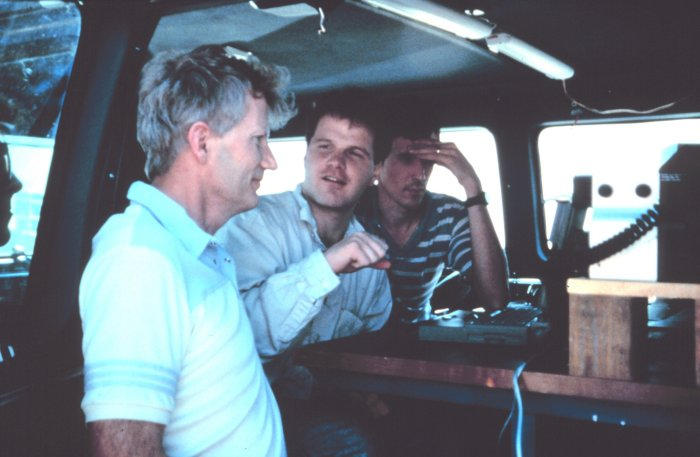
- Davies-Jones (left), Jerry Straka (center), and Erik Rasmussen (right) during Project VORTEX on 14 April 1994.
- Citizenship: British; American (1983)
- Education: University of Birmingham (B.Sc., 1964); University of Colorado Boulder (Ph.D. 1969)
- Known for: Tornadic supercell dynamics and tornadogenesis
- Awards: NOAA Distinguished Career Award; Nikolai Dotzek Award
- Scientific career
- Fields: Meteorology
- Workplaces: National Severe Storms Laboratory
- Thesis: The Linear Theory of Thermal Convection in Horizontal Plane Couette Flow (1969)

Robert Peter Davies-Jones is a British atmospheric scientist who substantially advanced understanding of supercell and tornado dynamics and of tornadogenesis. A theoretician, he utilized numerical simulations as well as storm chasing field investigations in his work as a longtime research meteorologist at the National Severe Storms Laboratory (NSSL) in Norman, Oklahoma.

Davies-Jones received a B.Sc. in physics from the University of Birmingham in 1964 and a Ph.D. in astrophysics from the University of Colorado Boulder in 1969. From 1969 to 1970 Davies-Jones did a post-doc at the National Center for Atmospheric Research (NCAR) before embarking on a long career at NSSL in 1970. He retired from NSSL in 2009 where he remains an emeritus researcher and continues to publish some papers. Davies-Jones is a Fellow of the American Meteorological Society (AMS). Davies-Jones earned the NOAA Distinguished Career Award and in 2018 the Nikolai Dotzek Lifetime Achievement Award by the European Severe Storms Laboratory (ESSL).

== See also ==
- Joseph B. Klemp
- Paul Markowski
- Erik N. Rasmussen
