= Paul Markowski =

Paul Markowski may refer to:

- Paul Markowski (meteorologist)
- Paul Markowski (politician)
