= Jeffrey Frame =

American meteorologist

Jeff Frame
- Education: University of Michigan (B.S., 2001); Pennsylvania State University (M.S., 2003; Ph.D., 2008)
- Known for: Severe convective storm modeling and observations
- Scientific career
- Fields: Meteorology
- Workplaces: Hobart and William Smith Colleges; University of Illinois at Urbana-Champaign
- Thesis: The Dynamical Impact of Anvil Shading on Simulated Supercell Thunderstorms (2008)
- Doctoral advisor: Paul Markowski

Jeffrey W. Frame is an American atmospheric scientist and professor at the University of Illinois at Urbana-Champaign. He is known for observational and modeling studies of severe convective storms and for teaching meteorology. He was a scientist for VORTEX2 and other field research programs.

== Early life and education ==
Frame is from Michigan. He graduated summa cum laude from the University of Michigan (UM) with a B.S. in Atmospheric, Oceanic, and Space Sciences in 2001. Moving on to the Pennsylvania State University (PSU) for graduate studies, he earned a M.S. in 2003 with the thesis The Interaction of Simulated Squall Lines with Complex Terrain and a Ph.D. in 2008 with the dissertation The Dynamical Impact of Anvil Shading on Simulated Supercell Thunderstorms.

== Career ==
Since 2010 he has been an instructor and assistant professor at the University of Illinois at Urbana-Champaign (UIUC). Frame is a member of the American Meteorological Society (AMS) and Chi Epsilon Pi. He participated in the International H2O Project (IHOP), Radar Observations of Tornadoes and Thunderstorms Experiment (ROTATE), Verification of the Origin of Rotation in Tornadoes Experiment 2 (VORTEX2), co-PI of Ontario Winter Lake-effect Storms (OWLeS), and other field experiments. He participated with the Doppler on Wheels (DOW) team for the ROTATE, VORTEX2, and OWLeS projects and as mobile mesonet leader for IHOP. He also participated in the DOW's deployment for teaching purposes at UIUC.
