= List of United States government meteorology research projects =

This is a timeline and list of meteorology research projects conducted by or funded by the United States federal government.

== List ==
Project	Years	Organizations involved	Refs
Project Cirrus	1947	United States Army Signal Corps; General Electric; Office of Naval Research; United States Air Force	
Project BATON	1962	United States Department of Defense; United States Army Signal Corps; Meteorology Research, Inc.	
Project Stormfury	1962–1983	National Oceanic and Atmospheric Administration	
Operation Popeye	1967–1972	United States Air Force	
TOtable Tornado Observatory (TOTO)	1979–1985	National Oceanic and Atmospheric Administration; National Severe Storms Laboratory; Environmental Technology Laboratory; University of Oklahoma	
Project NIMROD	1978	National Center for Atmospheric Research; University of Chicago; National Weather Service	
TOGA	1985–1994	World Climate Research Programme; World Meteorological Organization; United Nations; National Oceanic and Atmospheric Administration	
ERICA	1988–1989	Ocean Prediction Center	
GEWEX	1990–Present	World Climate Research Programme; World Meteorological Organization; United Nations; National Oceanic and Atmospheric Administration	
VORTEX1	1994–1995	National Severe Storms Laboratory; National Weather Service; University of Oklahoma	
UAEREP	2001–Present	National Center for Meteorology; National Center for Atmospheric Research; University of the Witwatersrand; NASA; National Science Foundation (Funding only)	
THORPEX	2003–Present	World Meteorological Organization; United Nations; National Oceanic and Atmospheric Administration	
International Cloud Experiment (TWP-ICE)	2006	United States Department of Energy; Bureau of Meteorology; NASA; European Commission DG RTD-1.2; University of Utah	
VORTEX2	2009–2010	National Severe Storms Laboratory; National Weather Service; Storm Prediction Center; University of Oklahoma; CIMMS; University of Illinois Urbana-Champaign; Center for Severe Weather Research; Bureau of Meteorology; Environment Canada; Office of Naval Research; University of Massachusetts Amherst; Texas Tech University; National Center for Atmospheric Research; National Science Foundation (Funding only)	
Recovering from Tornado Brain	2013–2024	University of Tennessee; University of Missouri; United States Department of Health and Human Services (Funding only)	
OWLeS	2013–2014	University of Illinois Urbana-Champaign; University of Wyoming; Millersville University; Hobart and William Smith Colleges; University of Alabama in Huntsville; Center for Severe Weather Research; University of Utah; State University of New York at Oswego; University at Albany; Pennsylvania State University; National Science Foundation (Funding only)	
VORTEX-SE / VORTEX USA	2015–2019	National Oceanic and Atmospheric Administration; National Severe Storms Laboratory; University of Oklahoma; University of Alabama in Huntsville; National Science Foundation	
Warn-on-Forecast (WoF or WoFS)	2016–Present	National Severe Storms Laboratory; University of Oklahoma	
Seeded and Natural Orographic Wintertime clouds: the Idaho Experiment (SNOWIE)	2017	University of Wyoming; National Center for Atmospheric Research (NCAR); University of Colorado; University of Illinois Urbana-Champaign; Idaho Power Company; National Science Foundation (Funding only)	
TORUS Project	2019–2022	National Severe Storms Laboratory; Office of Marine and Aviation Operations; University of Nebraska–Lincoln; University of Oklahoma; CIWRO; Texas Tech University; University of Colorado Boulder; National Science Foundation (Funding only)	
PERiLS Project	2022–2023	National Severe Storms Laboratory; NOAA Physical Sciences Laboratory; NOAA Global Systems Laboratory; National Weather Service; University of Oklahoma; CIWRO; University of Alabama in Huntsville; University of Louisiana at Monroe; Purdue University; Texas Tech University; Pennsylvania State University; University of Illinois Urbana-Champaign; North Carolina State University; Stony Brook University; National Science Foundation (Funding only)	
LIFT Project	2024–Present	National Severe Storms Laboratory; University of Oklahoma; CIWRO; Texas Tech University; Disaster Imaging Inc.; National Science Foundation (Funding only)	
