= Anthony Lyza =

American meteorologist

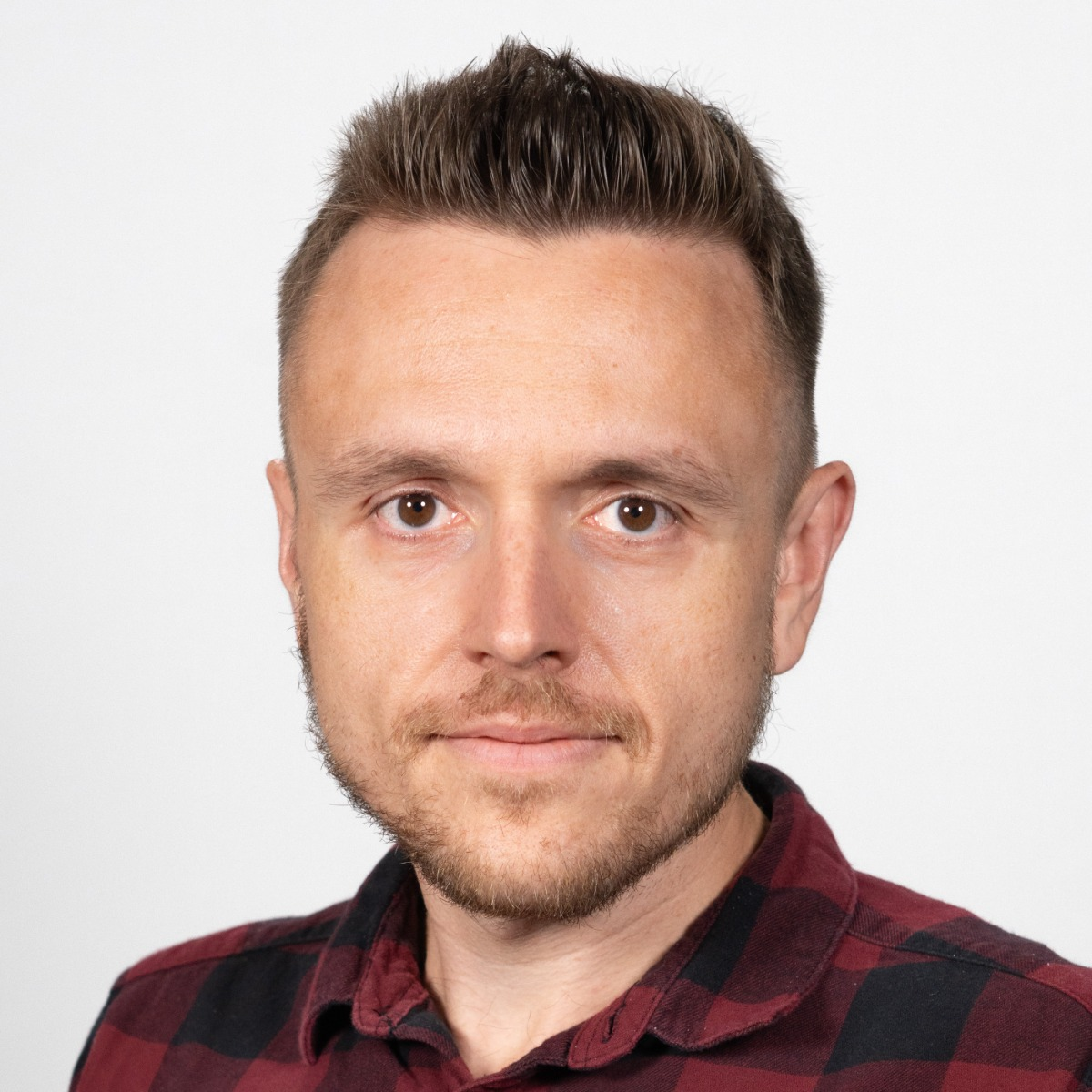
- Anthony Lyza in 2024
- Occupation: Meteorologist
- Known for: Head of the NOAA Testbed and Visualization Support Team; Expert on tornadoes
- Notable work: Lead author of the EF5 drought study published in 2025; Lead author of the 2019 Greenwood Springs tornado case study

Anthony W. Lyza is an American meteorologist and expert on tornadoes who heads the Testbed and Visualization Support Team, a branch of the National Severe Storms Laboratory (NSSL), one of the research laboratories of the National Oceanic and Atmospheric Administration (NOAA).

== Education ==
Lyza attended Valparaiso University in Indiana, where he graduated in 2012 with a bachelor's degrees in meteorology. He then attended the University of Alabama in Huntsville, where he graduated with a master's degree in 2015 and a Ph.D. in 2019, both in meteorology.

== Career ==
Lyza served as the Physical Sciences Coordinator for the VORTEX-USA Project, a meteorological research project led and funded by the United States government. Between 2022–2023, Lyza was a coordinating scientist on the PERiLS Project. Following the PERiLS Project, Lyza became the head of the Testbed and Visualization Support Team, which works at the NOAA Hazardous Weather Testbed (HWT) at the National Weather Center in Norman, Oklahoma.

Lyza is currently an Associate Editor of Monthly Weather Review and the Journal of Applied Meteorology and Climatology, both of which are published by the American Meteorological Society.

=== Publications ===
Lyza has authored numerous academic publications, the most notable publication being a case study, led by Lyza representing the National Severe Storms Laboratory (NSSL), with other authors from the University of Oklahoma's School of Meteorology, published with the American Meteorological Society titled Where Have the EF5s Gone? A Closer Look at the "Drought" of the Most Violent Tornadoes in the United States. The study was focusing on the "EF5 drought", which found that the probability of no EF5-rated tornadoes happening within an eleven-year span would be approximately 0.3%, contrary to the 55.6% of no EF5 tornado happening per year up to 2023. The study also questioned the reliability of the scale as a whole, asking "should tornado ratings be more reflective of total impact, and not solely tied to wind speed estimates?" while citing the four EF5 tornadoes during the 2011 Super Outbreak as a reason for inaccurate percentages. The case study was added into the National Oceanic and Atmospheric Administration's Library after its publication.

Another notable publication from Lyza was Damage Analysis and Close-Range Radar Observations of the 13 April 2019 Greenwood Springs, Mississippi, Tornado during VORTEX-SE Meso18-19, published in July 2022. This case study was led by Lyza, representing the National Severe Storms Laboratory and the University of Oklahoma, was in coordination with two other researchers with the University of Alabama in Huntsville and was funded by the National Oceanic and Atmospheric Administration to investigate the unsurveyed portion of the tornado track. The goal of the study was to investigate a 8.7 miles (14 km) stretch of the 2019 Greenwood Springs tornado's track which was unsurveyable to the National Weather Service. The study found that a NEXRAD radar only 980 yards (900 m) away from the tornado documented radial velocities of up to 182 mph (293 km/h). The researchers also found that the tornado "produced forest devastation and electrical infrastructure damage up to at least EF4 intensity" and conclude by writing that "the Greenwood Springs event was a violent tornado, potentially even EF5 intensity." The case study was also added into the National Oceanic and Atmospheric Administration's Library after its publication.

Other publications by Lyza include:

- The Propagation, Evolution, and Rotation in Linear Storms (PERiLS) Project, an October 2024 paper on the PERiLS Project which Lyza was second author on.
- Observed Relationships between Supercell Mesocyclone Intensity and Evolution, Background Environmental Characteristics, and Cell Mergers in 2024.
- Comparison of Tornado Damage Characteristics to Low-Altitude WSR-88D Radar Observations and Implications for Tornado Intensity Estimation in 2024 which Lyza was lead author on.
- The Influence of Cell Mergers on Supercell Characteristics and Tornado Evolution on 27–28 April 2011 in 2023, which Lyza was lead author on.
- A Multi-Platform Reanalysis of the Kankakee Valley Tornado Cluster on 30 June 2014 in 2019, which Lyza was lead author on.
