= Yvette Richardson =

American meteorologist

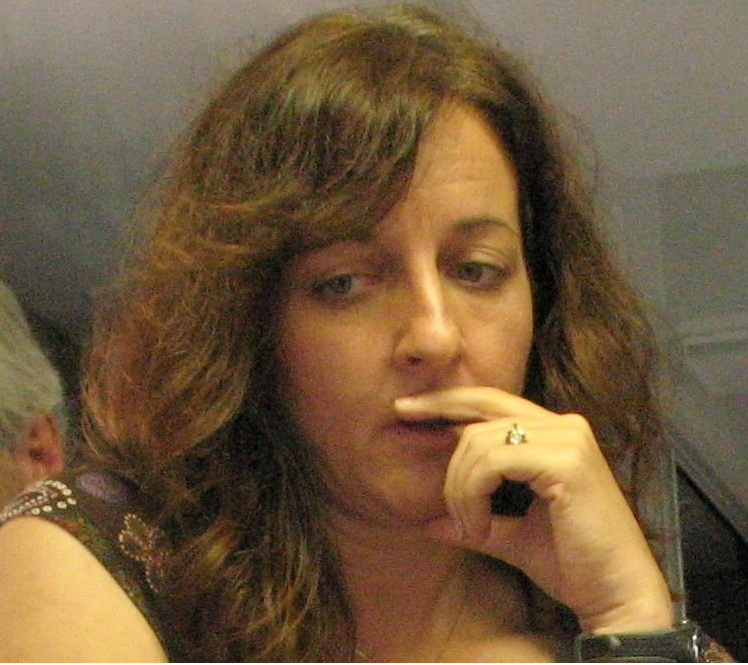
- Education: University of Wisconsin–River Falls (B.S., 1990); University of Oklahoma (M.S., 1993; Ph.D., 1999)
- Known for: Tornado and convection research
- Scientific career
- Fields: Meteorology
- Workplaces: Pennsylvania State University
- Thesis: The Influence of Horizontal Variations in Vertical Shear and Low-Level Moisture on Numerically Simulated Convective Storms (1999)
- Doctoral advisor: Kelvin K. Droegemeier
- Other academic advisors: Frederick H. Carr

Yvette Richardson is an American meteorologist with substantial contributions to tornado dynamics, tornadogenesis, the environments of tornadoes, supercells, and severe convection, and radar observations of these. She was a principal investigator (PI) of VORTEX2.

== Career ==
Richardson graduated with Special Academic Honors (sigma cum laude) at the University of Wisconsin–River Falls (UWRF) with a B.S. in physics in 1990. She earned a M.S. and Ph.D. in meteorology from the University of Oklahoma (OU) in 1993 and 1999, respectively. Richardson was a visiting assistant professor at OU from 1998 to 2000, was a research scientist at OU from 2000 to 2001, and has been a professor at Pennsylvania State University (PSU) since 2002. She is a member of Sigma Pi Sigma and Phi Kappa Phi.

Richardson was on the steering committee, was a scientific-PI, and was co-coordinator of mobile mesonets for VORTEX2. She previously collaborated in other field projects, including PAMREX, (2003–2004), IHOP (2002), ROTATE (2000, 2001, 2004), and VORTEX1 (1994–1995). She co-authored the textbook, Mesoscale Meteorology in Midlatitudes, with Paul Markowski with whom she also wrote a major Weatherwise magazine article, "How to Make a Tornado". Richardson is a co-writer of a rebuttal to a New York Times opinion piece by physicist Richard A. Muller, challenging his contention that tornadic activity had decreased in the U.S. and his tying the alleged decline to global warming.

== See also ==
- Erik N. Rasmussen
