= Mobile radar observation of tornadoes =

A Doppler on Wheels (DOW) radar loop of a hook echo and associated mesocyclone in Goshen County, Wyoming on June 5, 2009. A strong mesocyclone is shown as adjacent areas of yellow and blue on this color table (on other radars, it might be bright red and bright green), and may indicate an imminent or ongoing tornado.

Mobile radars, in a meteorological context, are Doppler weather radars affixed to vehicles (or aircraft) for academic or military research. In the mid-1990s, mobile weather radars were designed and created with the goal to study atmospheric phenomena.

== History ==
Transportable weather radars have been used on dozens of scientific and academic research projects from their invention in the 1950s. A problem facing meteorological researchers was mesonets (themselves developed to fill in gaps between widely spaced weather stations) and other ground-based observation methods were often deployed deployed too slowly to accurately and sufficiently completely record significant atmospheric phenomena. In 1993, the Electra Doppler Radar (ELDORA) system was created, consisting of a dual-beam radar mounted on top of a Lockheed P-3 Orion aircraft. The system was designed to provide high-resolution measurements of characteristics of very large storms when ground-based radar cannot.

Between 1994-1995, the initial Doppler on Wheels (DOW) was constructed and was deployed for the first time at the end of the VORTEX1 Project. The DOW was developed by Joshua Wurman and collaborators to obtain recordings within tornadoes and their vicinity to augment the mobile mesonets which had been developed to place observations directly where needed around storms instead of relying on storms to pass over fixed mesonet or other observation sites. The Doppler on Wheels led to several scientific breakthroughs and theories regarding tornadoes and tornadogenesis, such as how tornadoes work within their life cycles and how tornadoes form. The DOWs led to the “first tornado wind maps, measurements of an axial downdraft and lofted debris, multiple vortices, winds versus damage and surface measurement intercomparisons, winds as low as 3–4 m (9.8–13.1 ft) above ground level (AGL) and low-level inflow, 3D ground-based velocity track display (GBVTD) vector wind field retrievals, rapid evolution of debris over varying land use and terrain, documentation of cyclonic/anticyclonic tornado pairs, and documentation of varied and complex tornado wind field structures including multiple wind field maxima and multiple vortex mesocyclones, downward propagation of vorticity and an extensive climatology of tornado intensity and size revealing, quantitatively, that tornadoes are often much more intense and larger than indicated by damage surveys.”

In 2011, Howard Bluestein, a research professor at the University of Oklahoma (OU), led a team to develop the Rapid X-band Polarimetric Radar (RaXPol). In 2013, researchers published at the American Meteorological Society (AMS) that RaXPol was created because “the need for rapidly scanning weather radars for observing fast-changing weather phenomena such as convective storms, microbursts, small-scale features in hurricanes, and the process of convective development has been well established” throughout history. This included publications by the National Center for Atmospheric Research (NCAR) in 1983, research by several scientists published in 2001, and published research by the U.S. federal government in 2012. The United States Department of Defense gave the University of Oklahoma over $5 million (2019 USD) in the development of new mobile radars, which were set to be used by the United States Navy.

In 2023, the University of Oklahoma, along with the National Severe Storms Laboratory (NSSL) developed and deployed the first ever fully digital mobile phased array radar, Horus.

== List of notable observations ==
Several tornadoes throughout the last few decades have been observed by various mobile radars. However, only the most notable ones are used for academic research and subsequently published. This is a list of known tornadoes which were observed by mobile radars.

=== 1990–1999 ===
Official rating	Date	Location	Minimum peak wind speed	Maximum peak wind speed	Highest confirmed peak wind speed
F4	April 26, 1991	Red Rock, Oklahoma	268 mph (431 km/h)	286 mph (460 km/h)	286 mph (460 km/h)
A University of Oklahoma chase team headed by Howard Bluestein utilized mobile doppler weather radar to analyze the tornado. The radar measured peak winds of 120–125 m/s (270–280 mph; 430–450 km/h) between 150–190 m (490–620 ft) above the surface. According to the Oklahoma Mesonet, winds as high as 286 mph (460 km/h) were possibly measured. At the time, this represented the strongest winds ever measured by radar, including the first measurements of F5 intensity winds.
F3	May 16, 1995	Hanston, Kansas	82.6 m/s (185 mph; 297 km/h)	—N/a	82.6 m/s (185 mph; 297 km/h)
As part of VORTEX-95, Doppler on Wheels 1 deployed west of Hanston, KS and scanned an F3 tornado for 45 minutes. DOW 1 recorded a peak ground-relative wind speed of 82.6 m/s (185 mph; 297 km/h) at a range of 13 km. This is the first tornado ever scanned by a Doppler on Wheels vehicle.
F2	June 2, 1995	Dimmitt, Texas	95 m/s (210 mph; 340 km/h)	—N/a	95 m/s (210 mph; 340 km/h)
A Doppler on Wheels vehicle recorded a peak ground-relative wind speed of 95 m/s (210 mph; 340 km/h). Peak velocity differences (ΔV) recorded at an altitude of around 60 meters reached 139 m/s (310 mph; 500 km/h).
F2	June 8, 1995	McLean, Texas	35 m/s (78 mph; 130 km/h)	—N/a	35 m/s (78 mph; 130 km/h)
F2	June 8, 1995	McLean, Texas	—N/a	—N/a	—N/a
F0	June 8, 1995	McLean, Texas	—N/a	—N/a	—N/a
F4	June 8, 1995	McLean, Texas	—N/a	—N/a	92 m/s (210 mph; 330 km/h)
F0	June 8, 1995	McLean, Texas	—N/a	—N/a	—N/a
A cyclic supercell near McLean, Texas produced five tornadoes, all of which were observed by ELDORA aircraft. The F4 tornado was recorded to have 92 m/s (210 mph; 330 km/h) winds.
F4	May 30, 1998	Spencer, South Dakota	234 mph (377 km/h)	264 mph (425 km/h)	264 mph (425 km/h)
A Doppler on Wheels recorded winds of 264 mph (425 km/h) "well below" 50 metres (160 ft) above the ground level, "perhaps as low as 5–10 metres (16–33 ft) above the radar level". The Doppler on Wheels also recorded a confirmed five-second wind speed average of 112 m/s (250 mph; 400 km/h).
F4	May 3, 1999	Mulhall, Oklahoma	246 mph (396 km/h)	299 mph (481 km/h)	257 mph (414 km/h)
A Doppler on Wheels documented the largest-ever-observed core flow circulation with a distance of 1,600 m (5,200 ft) between peak velocities on either side of the tornado, and a roughly 7 km (4.3 mi) width of peak wind gusts exceeding 43 m/s (96 mph), making the Mulhall tornado the largest tornado ever measured quantitatively. The DOW measured a complex multi-vortex structure, with several vortices containing winds of up to 115 m/s (260 mph) rotating around the tornado. The 3D structure of the tornado has been analyzed in a 2005 article in the Journal of the Atmospheric Sciences by Wen-Chau Lee and Joshua Wurman. In 2024, it was published that the radar did measure winds of approximately 257 mph (414 km/h) approximately 30 m (98 ft) above the radar level.
F5	May 3, 1999	Bridge Creek, Oklahoma	281 mph (452 km/h)	321 mph (517 km/h)	321 mph (517 km/h)
In 2007, Joshua Wurman along with other researchers, published that a Doppler on Wheels recorded 135 m/s (300 mph; 490 km/h) approximately 32 metres (105 ft) above the radar level. In 2021, Wurman along with other researchers, revised the data using improved techniques and published that the Doppler on Wheels actually recorded 321 miles per hour (517 km/h) in the tornado.

=== 2000–2009 ===
Official rating	Date	Location	Minimum peak wind speed	Maximum peak wind speed	Highest confirmed peak wind speed
F0	April 30, 2000	Crowell, Texas	—N/a	—N/a	—N/a
F0	April 30, 2000	Crowell, Texas	—N/a	—N/a	—N/a
F0	April 30, 2000	Crowell, Texas	—N/a	—N/a	—N/a
Three F0 tornadoes were observed by Doppler on Wheels near Crowell, Texas on April 30, 2000.
F1	April 30, 2000	Oklaunion, Texas	—N/a	—N/a	—N/a
A Doppler on Wheels observed this F1 tornado.
F2	May 29, 2004	Geary, Oklahoma	—N/a	—N/a	181 mph (291 km/h)
A Doppler on Wheels recorded a peak wind gust of 81 m/s (180 mph; 290 km/h) at 6.5 m (21 ft) above the ground level.
F1	May 29, 2004	Calumet, Oklahoma	—N/a	—N/a	—N/a
A Doppler on Wheels observed an anticyclonic F1 tornado near Calumet, Oklahoma.
F1	May 13, 2005	Truscott, Texas	—N/a	—N/a	110 mph (180 km/h)
A Doppler on Wheels observed the tornado and recorded a peak wind speed of 110 mph (180 km/h).
F3	May 13, 2005	Vera, Texas	—N/a	—N/a	177 mph (285 km/h)
A Doppler on Wheels recorded a peak wind speed of 177 mph (285 km/h) about 30 m (98 ft) above the ground level.
F0	May 13, 2005	Bomarton, Texas	—N/a	—N/a	51 mph (82 km/h)
A Doppler on Wheels recorded a peak wind speed of 51 mph (82 km/h) about 20 m (66 ft) above the ground level.
F2	June 12, 2005	Clairemont, Texas	100 mph (160 km/h)	201 mph (323 km/h)	201 mph (323 km/h)
A Doppler on Wheels observed the tornado through its entire life. The radar recorded winds of 100 mph (160 km/h), 145 mph (233 km/h), and 201 mph (323 km/h) at various heights ranging from 3–50 m (9.8–164.0 ft).
F0	June 15, 2005	Trego Center, Kansas	—N/a	—N/a	—N/a
A Doppler on Wheels observed the tornado in an open field.
EF5	May 4, 2007	Greensburg, Kansas	—N/a	—N/a	179 mph (288 km/h)
An X-band mobile radar owned by the University of Massachusetts (UMass X-Pol) observed the tornado for roughly 34 minutes after its birth. Recorded winds "exceeding 80 m/s" (179 mph; 288 km/h) were noted roughly 1.5 km above the radar level.
EF2	June 5, 2009	Goshen County, Wyoming	—N/a	—N/a	161 mph (259 km/h)
Multiple Doppler on Wheels trucks observed the entire lifecycle of an EF2 tornado in Goshen County, Wyoming. The Rapid-Scan DOW radar observed a peak wind speed of 161 mph (259 km/h) at 15–20 m (49–66 ft) above the ground level.

=== 2010–2019 ===
Official rating	Date	Location	Minimum peak wind speed	Maximum peak wind speed	Highest confirmed peak wind speed
EF5	May 24, 2011	Hinton, Oklahoma	289 mph (465 km/h)	296 mph (476 km/h)	295.5 mph (475.6 km/h)
RaXPol recorded a wind gust of 124.8 m/s (279 mph; 449 km/h) about 200–230 feet (60–70 m) above the radar level. However, this data was later revised to be 132.1 m/s (295 mph; 476 km/h) at 72 ft (22 m) above the radar level.
EF4	May 18, 2013	Rozel, Kansas	165 mph (266 km/h)	185 mph (298 km/h)	185 mph (298 km/h)
A Doppler on Wheels recorded "near surface" winds of between 165–185 mph (266–298 km/h).
EF2	May 19, 2013	Clearwater, Kansas	—N/a	—N/a	155 mph (249 km/h)
A Doppler on Wheels recorded winds of 155 mph (249 km/h) at 70 m (230 ft) above the ground level.
EF5	May 20, 2013	Moore, Oklahoma	—N/a	—N/a	140 mph (230 km/h)
A PX-1000 transportable radar unit operated by University of Oklahoma's Advanced Radar Research Center was used to observe the path of the tornado through Moore, with researchers detailing a "loop" in the path near the Moore Medical Center as a "failed occlusion".
EF3	May 28, 2013	Bennington, Kansas	—N/a	—N/a	264 mph (425 km/h)
A Doppler on Wheels recorded winds of 264 mph (425 km/h) approximately 153 ft (47 m) above the ground level.
EF3	May 31, 2013	El Reno, Oklahoma	291 mph (468 km/h)	336 mph (541 km/h)	313 mph (504 km/h)
A Doppler on Wheels recorded winds between 257–336 mph (414–541 km/h) at or less than 100 metres (330 ft) above the radar level in a suction vortex inside the tornado. This was later revised by the Doppler on Wheels team to 291–336 mph (468–541 km/h). In 2015, Howard Bluestein, along with other researchers, reported that the radar did capture at least a moment of winds of 313 miles per hour (504 km/h).
EF3	May 9, 2016	Sulphur, Oklahoma	—N/a	—N/a	218 mph (351 km/h)
A Doppler on Wheels operated by the Center for Severe Weather Research recorded winds of 218 mph (351 km/h) at 17 m (56 ft) above the radar level.
EF2	May 24, 2016	Dodge City, Kansas	—N/a	—N/a	201 mph (323 km/h)
While a Doppler on Wheels was observing the tornado, it documented winds of 40 m/s (89 mph; 140 km/h), which increased to at least 90 m/s (200 mph; 320 km/h) over a span of 21 seconds. These winds lasted less than one minute.
EF2	May 20, 2019	Mangum, Oklahoma	—N/a	—N/a	180 mph (290 km/h)
The University of Oklahoma's RaXPol and a Doppler on Wheels truck both observed this tornado. RaXPol recorded a maximum VROT of 106.6 knots (122.7 mph; 197.4 km/h), while DOW7 recorded peak winds of ~80 metres per second (290 km/h; 180 mph)

=== 2023 ===
Official rating	Date	Location	Minimum peak wind speed	Maximum peak wind speed	Highest confirmed peak wind speed
EF4	March 24, 2023	Rolling Fork, Mississippi	—N/a	—N/a	152 mph (245 km/h)
At least two mobile radars on the PERiLS Project observed the violent EF4 tornado at a height of 600–700 m (2,000–2,300 ft) above the radar level.

=== 2024 ===
Official rating	Date	Location	Minimum peak wind speed	Maximum peak wind speed	Highest confirmed peak wind speed
EF3	April 26, 2024	Harlan, Iowa	—N/a	—N/a	224 mph (360 km/h)
A Doppler on Wheels recorded a wind gust of ~79 m/s (180 mph) about 258 m (846 ft) above the radar level. Peak ground level wind speed was estimated around 224 mph (360 km/h).
EF2	April 27, 2024	Dexter, Kansas	—N/a	—N/a	—N/a
EF1	April 27, 2024	Dexter, Kansas	—N/a	—N/a	—N/a
A Doppler on Wheels observed an EF2 and an EF1 tornado near Dexter, Kansas.
EF2	May 19, 2024	Custer City, Oklahoma	—N/a	—N/a	197 mph (317 km/h)
A Ka-band mobile radar unit from Texas Tech University recorded a 0-second gust of 87.9 m/s.
EF4	May 21, 2024	Greenfield, Iowa	309 mph (497 km/h)	318 mph (512 km/h)	≥309 mph (497 km/h)
A Doppler on Wheels recorded winds of 263–271 mph (423–436 km/h) approximately 30–50 m (98–164 ft) above the radar level. Following calculations to more accurately determine peak wind speeds, it was published that ground-relative winds of 309–318 mph (497–512 km/h) could be observed briefly to the immediate east of the main circulation.
EF2	May 22, 2024	Temple, Texas	—N/a	—N/a	—N/a
A Doppler on Wheels observed an EF2 tornado near Temple, Texas.
EF2	May 23, 2024	Duke, Oklahoma & Olustee, Oklahoma	—N/a	—N/a	190 mph (310 km/h)
Two Doppler on Wheels scanned a large and long-lived EF2 tornado near Duke, Oklahoma. A mobile radar from Texas Tech University recorded winds of 190 mph (310 km/h) less than 20 m (22 yd) above the surface.
EFU	May 25, 2024	Windthorst, Texas	—N/a	—N/a	—N/a
The University of Oklahoma’s RaXPol observed and documented a tornado near Windthorst, Texas.

== See also ==
- Convective storm detection
