= Karen Kosiba =

American meteorologist

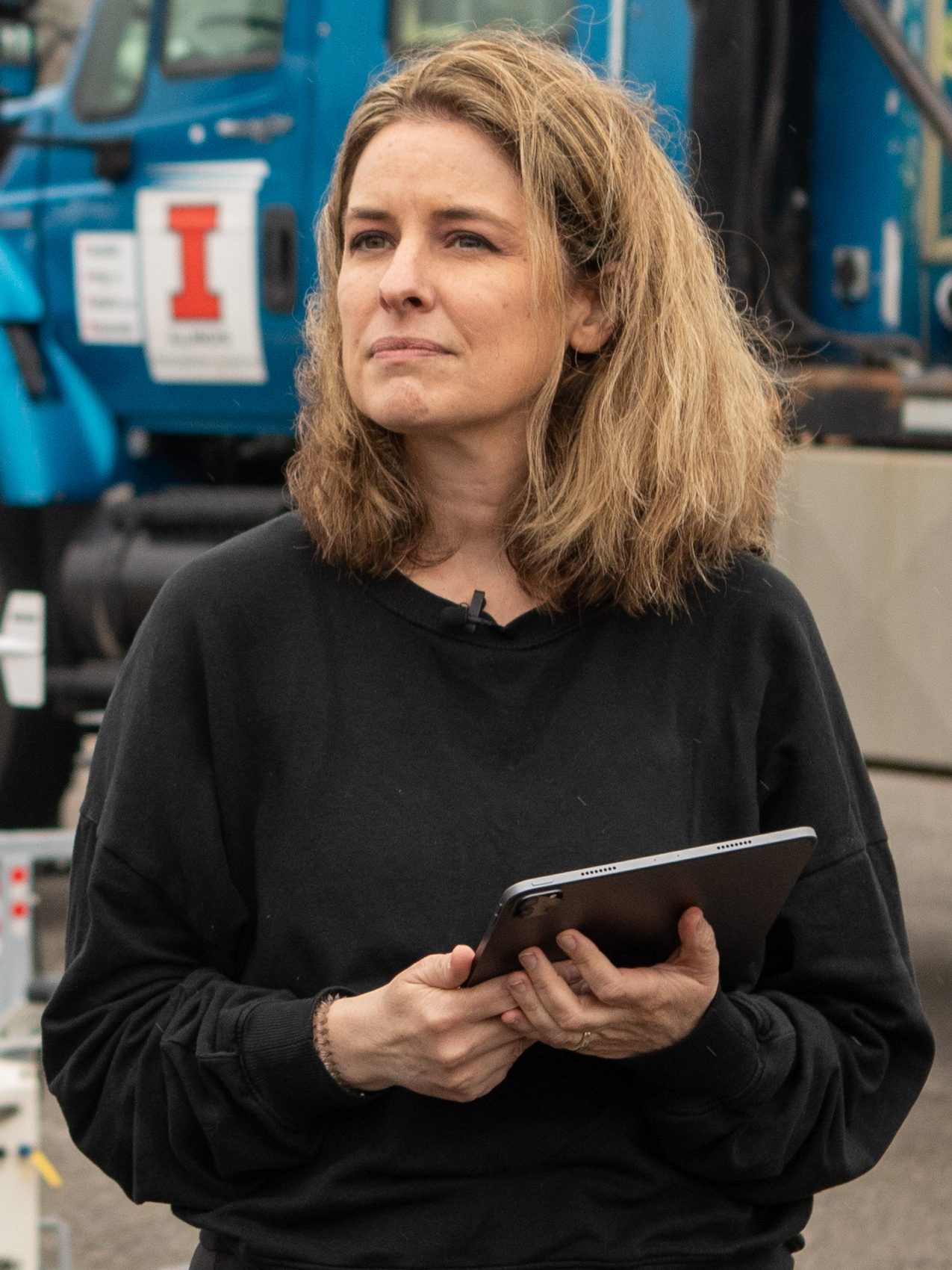
- Kosiba in 2023
- Born: Chicago Metropolitan Area, Illinois, US
- Education: Loyola University Chicago (BS, 1999); Miami University (MS, 2002, MAT, 2003); Purdue University (PhD, 2009)
- Known for: Weather radar, tornado, and hurricane research; field research and inventions
- Scientific career
- Fields: Atmospheric sciences
- Workplaces: University of Alabama in Huntsville; University of Illinois Urbana-Champaign; Flexible Array of Radars and Mesonets; Center for Severe Weather Research
- Thesis: A Comparison of Radar Observations to Real Data Simulations of Axisymmetric Tornadoes (2009)
- Doctoral advisor: Robert J. Trapp
- Other academic advisors: Christopher Church; Joshua Wurman

Karen Kosiba is an American atmospheric scientist and researcher at the University of Alabama in Huntsville Severe Weather Institute – Radar & Lightning Laboratories (SWIRLL) and managing director of the Flexible Array of Radars and Mesonets (FARM Facility), a research team which manages the Doppler on Wheels mobile radar fleet used to gather data on tornadoes and other severe weather.

== Education ==
Kosiba received a bachelor's degree in the field of physics from Loyola University Chicago in 1999, and later received a Master of Science and Master of Arts in Teaching from Miami University in 2002 and 2003. She completed her Doctor of Philosophy in atmospheric science from Purdue University in 2009 under doctoral advisor Dr. Robert J. Trapp.

== Career ==
She participated in the PERiLS Project, which aimed to study how tornadoes form within squall lines. In July 2021, Kosiba was featured on the American Meteorological Society's podcast, AMS on the Air. On May 21, 2024, she operated a Doppler on Wheels mobile radar while observing the Greenfield, Iowa EF4 tornado. In late 2024, she led the FARM project aside meteorologist Joshua Wurman.

== See also ==
- Robin Tanamachi
- Joshua Wurman
- Doppler on Wheels
