= OWLeS =

Ontario Winter Lake effect-Systems (OWLeS)
- Location: Lake Ontario, SUNY Oswego
- Owner: SUNY Oswego
- Established: 5-21 December 2013, 4-29 January 2014
- Funding: NSF
- Status: Research Phase
- Website: http://www.owles.org/

The Ontario Winter Lake-effect Systems (OWLeS) was a field project focused on three modes of lake-effect snow: Short-fetch, long-fetch, and downstream coastal and orographic effects. The project was conducted along Lake Ontario in the Great Lakes region and in the Finger Lakes region of upstate New York. OWLeS occurred in two field phases, one in December 2013 and another in January 2014. The project is a collaborative effort of nine universities and the Center for Severe Weather Research and is funded by the National Science Foundation (NSF).

== Principal investigators ==
- David Kristovich, adjunct associate professor, director of Atmospheric Sciences Group, University of Illinois at Urbana–Champaign
- Bart Geerts, associate professor, University of Wyoming
- Richard Clark, department chairman and professor of meteorology, Millersville University
- Jeffrey Frame, clinical assistant professor, University of Illinois at Urbana–Champaign
- Neil Laird, associate professor of Atmospheric Science, Hobart and William Smith Colleges
- Kevin Knupp, professor, University of Alabama in Huntsville
- Joshua Wurman, president, Center for Severe Weather Research
- Karen Kosiba, research scientist, Center for Severe Weather Research
- Nicholas Metz, assistant professor of Geosciences, Hobart and William Smith Colleges
- Todd Sikora, professor, Millersville University
- Jim Steenburgh, professor, University of Utah
- Scott Steiger, associate professor, State University of New York at Oswego
- Justin Minder, assistant professor, State University of New York at Albany
- George Young, professor, Pennsylvania State University
