= Robin Tanamachi =

American meteorologist

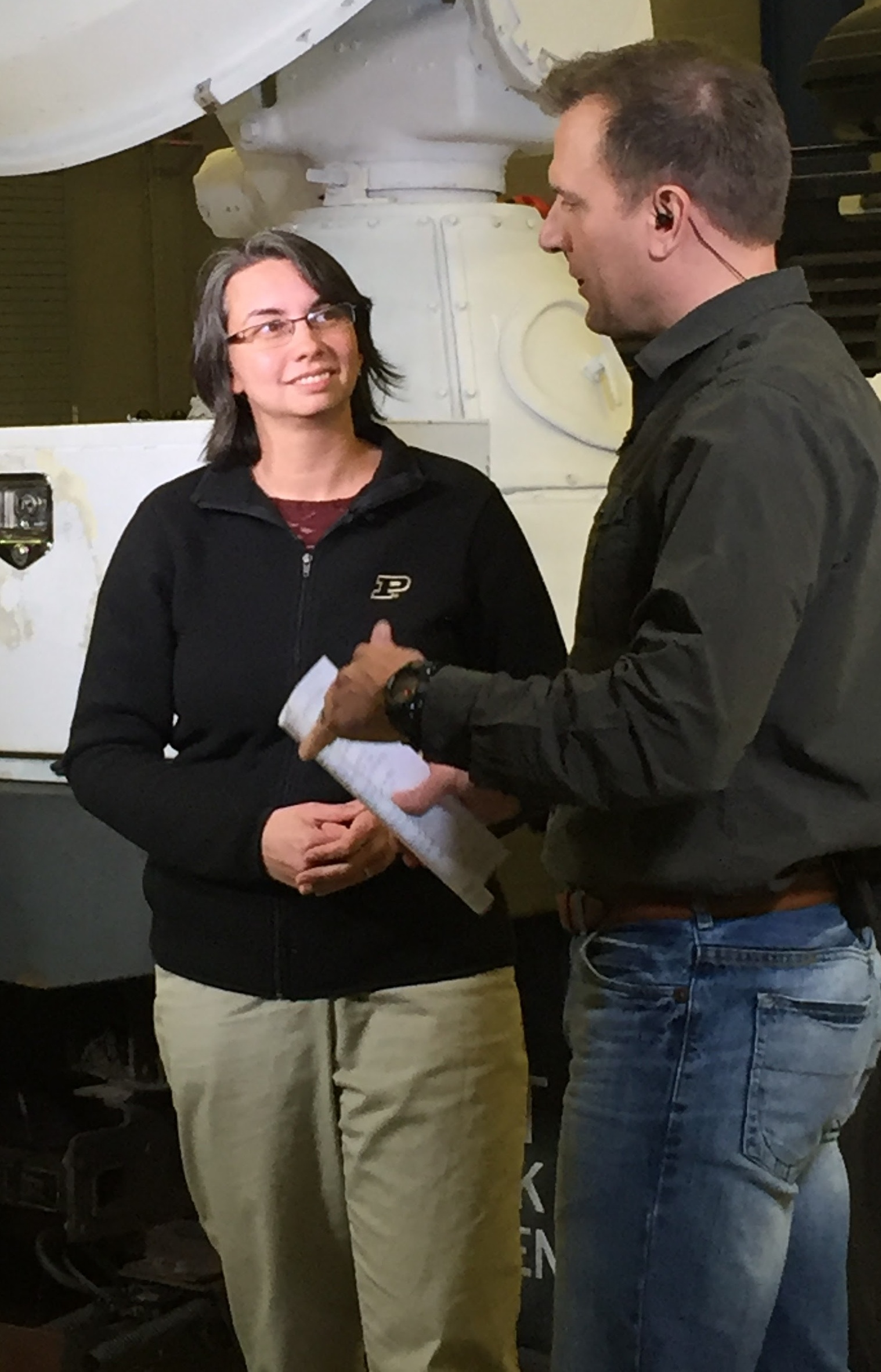
- Tanamachi in 2016
- Born: 1979 (age 46–47); Twin Cities Area, Minnesota, US
- Education: University of Wisconsin-Madison (BS, 2001); University of Oklahoma (MS, 2004); University of Oklahoma (PhD, 2011)
- Known for: Weather radar and tornado research
- Scientific career
- Fields: Atmospheric sciences
- Workplaces: Purdue University; Cooperative Institute for Severe and High-Impact Weather Research and Operations
- Thesis: Multiple cyclic tornado production modes in the 5 May 2007 Greensburg, Kansas supercell storm (2011)
- Doctoral advisor: Howard Bluestein
- Other academic advisors

Robin Tanamachi is an American atmospheric scientist and associate professor at the Department of Earth, Atmospheric, and Planetary Sciences at Purdue University. Tanamachi specializes in radar meteorology and has participated in numerous research studies, including VORTEX2 and VORTEX-SE.

== Early life and education ==
Tanamachi grew up in the Minneapolis–Saint Paul metropolitian area. In 1986, she watched a live broadcast showing a tornado, which pushed her to say that she "wanted to be a research meteorologist and study tornadoes". Tanamachi moved to Norman, Oklahoma to work for research meteorologist Howard Bluestein after graduating from the University of Oklahoma.

She received a bachelor's degree in Atmospheric and Oceanic Sciences at the University of Wisconsin–Madison in 2001. In 2004, she received a master's degree in meteorology and in 2011 received a Doctor of Philosophy, both at the University of Oklahoma School of Meteorology.

== Career ==
Tanamachi served on the American Meteorological Society (AMS) Radar Meteorology Committee from 2013 to 2019.

In a 2024 article produced by BBC and titled What it's really like to be a tornado chaser, Tanamachi gave her account on surviving the 2013 El Reno EF3 tornado, stating "I realised it was very likely the tornado was killing people while I was collecting data".
