= Roger Wakimoto =

American meteorologist

Roger M. Wakimoto
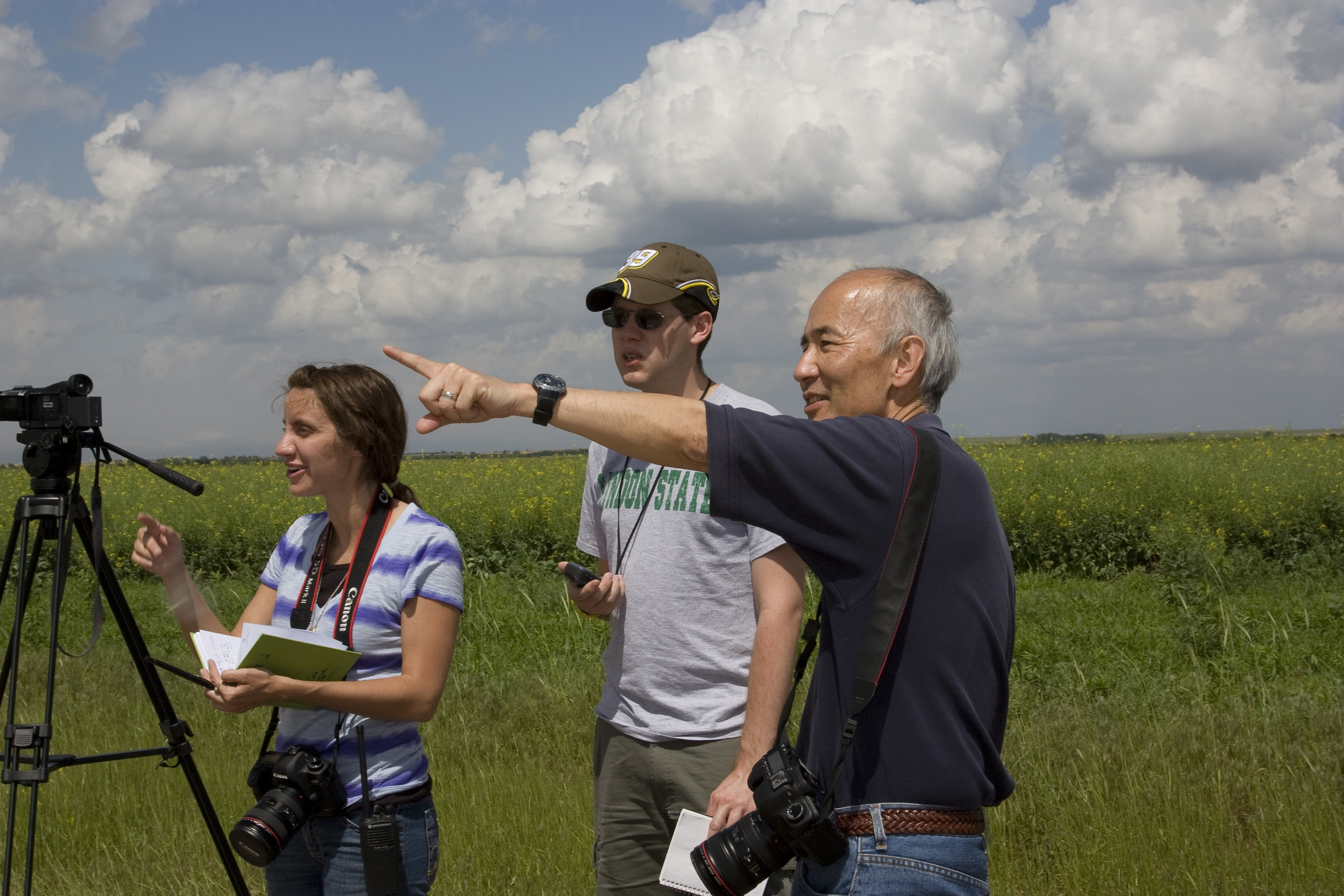
- Roger Wakimoto (right), in field project with students, 2010
- Born: December 11, 1953 (age 72)
- Education: San Jose State University (B.S., 1976); University of Chicago (Ph.D., 1981)
- Scientific career
- Workplaces: UCLA, NCAR, NSF
- Thesis: Investigations of Thunderstorm Gust Fronts from Project NIMROD Data (1981)
- Doctoral advisor: Ted Fujita

Roger M. Wakimoto (born December 11, 1953) is an atmospheric scientist specializing in research on mesoscale meteorology, particularly severe convective storms and radar meteorology. A former director of the National Center for Atmospheric Research (NCAR), Wakimoto in November 2012 was appointed as assistant director of the Directorate for Geosciences (GEO) of the National Science Foundation (NSF).

== Career ==
Wakimoto studied meteorology at San Jose State University (SJSU), earning a B.S. with high honors in 1976. He then earned a Ph.D. in geophysical science at the University of Chicago in 1981 with the dissertation Investigations of Thunderstorm Gust Fronts from Project NIMROD Data under advisor Ted Fujita. He was a research associate in the Department of the Geophysical Sciences from 1981-1983.

In 1983, Wakimoto became an assistant professor in the Department of Atmospheric Sciences at the University of California, Los Angeles (UCLA) where he remained for 22 years, eventually was promoted to professor in 1993 and served as department chairperson from 1996-2000.

Wakimoto arrived at the NCAR in 2005 as associate director of the Earth Observing Laboratory (EOL) and was appointed director of NCAR in 2010. Dr. Wakimoto remained director of NCAR until February 2013 when he was offered a post by the National Science Foundation NSF as assistant director for the Directorate for Geosciences (GEO). Wakimoto was a principal investigator of VORTEX2, the field project phase of which occurred in 2009-2010. He has participated in a dozen major field experiments including NIMROD (1978), JAWS (1982), ERICA (1988/89), VORTEX (1994/95), FASTEX (1997), IHOP (2002), BAMEX (2003), and VORTEX2 (2009/10).

When Wakimoto took the position of National Science Foundation assistant director for the geosciences, he oversaw a budget of nearly $1 billion for research on atmospheric, ocean, polar, and Earth sciences. His predecessor from July 2008 - June 2012, Tim Killeen, was also NCAR director prior to heading NSF GEO.

Wakimoto was elected a Fellow of the American Meteorological Society (AMS) in 1996, was a Councilor from 1997-2000, and received its Clarence Leroy Meisinger Award for "significant contributions to the understanding of mesoscale phenomena through insightful and detailed analysis of observations" in 1992. He served on the AMS Committee on Severe Local Storms from 1987-1991 (chair, 1988-1991), the UCAR/AMS Committee on the Study on Observational Systems from 1988-1990, and the AMS Committee on Radar Meteorology from 2000-2004 (chair, 2001-2004). He has published over 100 journal articles and was associate editor of Monthly Weather Review, as well as co-editor of AMS Meteorological Monograph: Radar and Atmospheric Science: A Collection of Essays in Honor of David Atlas. From 2003-2006, he served on the National Academies Board on Atmospheric Sciences and Climate (BASC).

== See also ==
- Erik N. Rasmussen
- Joshua Wurman
