= Donald W. Burgess =

American meteorologist (born 1947)

Don Burgess
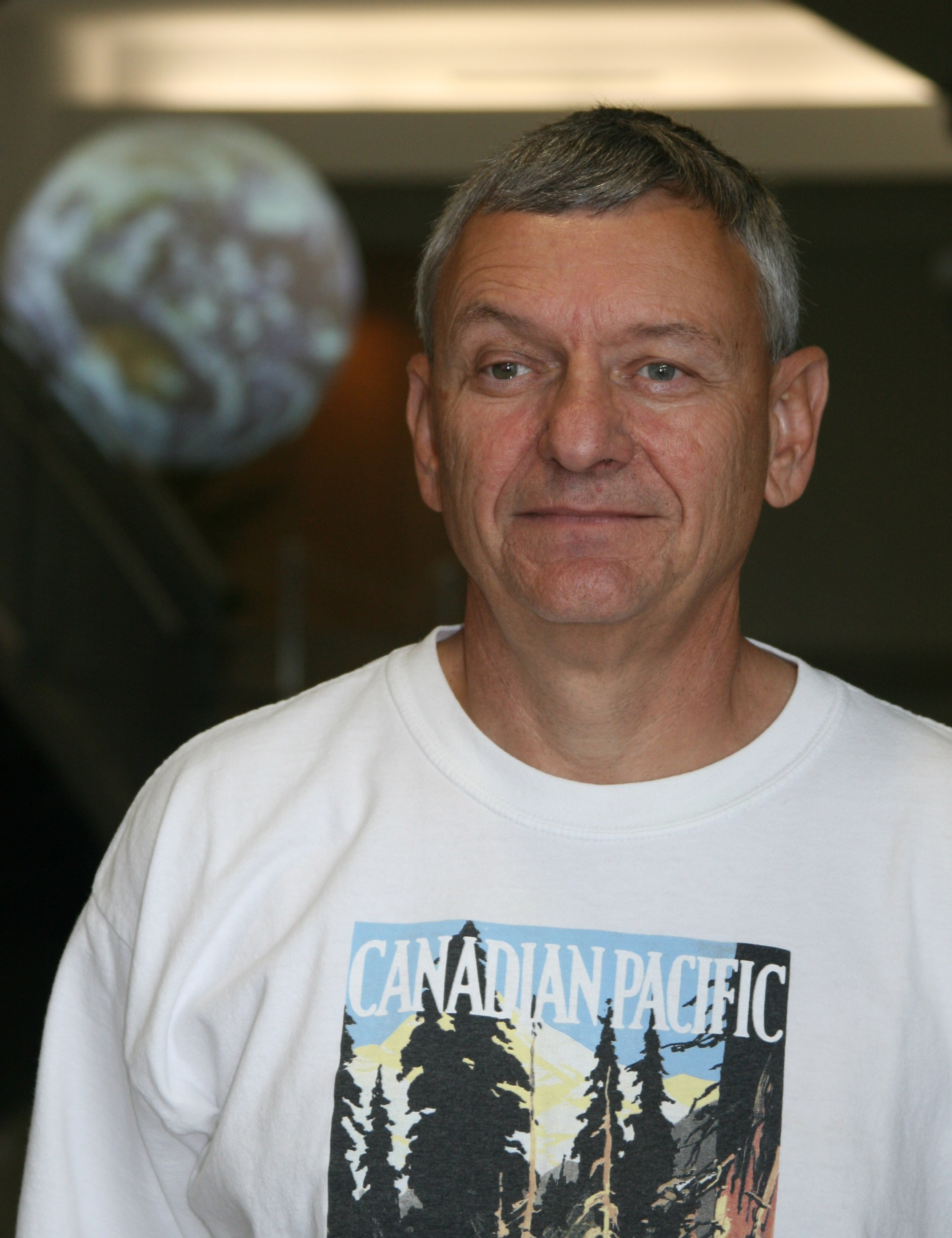
- Born: 1947 (age 78–79); Okmulgee, Oklahoma, U.S.
- Education: University of Oklahoma (B.S., 1971; M.S., 1974)
- Known for: Radar research and training on severe convective storms and tornadoes
- Awards: 1976 NOAA's Special Achievement Award; 1979 NOAA's Research Outstanding Scientific Paper; 2003 NOAA's Bronze Medal; 2007 NOAA's Research Outstanding Paper Award
- Scientific career
- Fields: Meteorology
- Workplaces: National Severe Storms Laboratory; CIMMS / OU; NWS Warning Decision Training Branch

Donald W. Burgess (born 1947) is an American meteorologist who has made important contributions to understanding of severe convective storms, particularly tornadoes, radar observations and techniques, as well as to training other meteorologists. He was a radar operator during the first organized storm chasing expeditions by the University of Oklahoma (OU) in the early 1970s and participated in both the VORTEX projects.

== Biography ==
Burgess was born in 1947 in Okmulgee, Oklahoma. Burgess studied atmospheric sciences and meteorology at OU, attaining a B.S. in engineering in 1971 and a M.S. in 1974. He worked at the National Severe Storms Laboratory (NSSL) as a research meteorologist and made major contributions to the NEXRAD Doppler radar program, especially concerning severe storms and tornadoes. Burgess led the team that developed the tornadic vortex signature (TVS) and also pioneered development of the concept of nowcasting as he used radar at NSSL in directing research teams to intercept severe and tornadic storms. Burgess additionally participated in the field for field projects, was a collaborator for VORTEX1 from 1994-1995, and was on the steering committee and was a principal investigator (PI) for VORTEX2 from 2009-2010. Another area of focus has been improving weather forecasting. Burgess also worked at the Radar Training Branch (RTB), the NEXRAD Operational Support Facility (OSF), and the Cooperative Institute for Mesoscale Meteorological Studies (CIMMS) at the University of Oklahoma.

Burgess has appeared on NOVA and National Geographic Explorer, as well as in the IMAX documentary Tornado Alley. He has been featured in The Atlantic, Weatherwise, the USA Today, and other publications. In retirement he worked with other prominent severe storms researchers on an informal six year resurvey project of the Tri-State Tornado. He has previously done comprehensive resurvey work on the 1947 Glazier–Higgins–Woodward tornadoes. Burgess is also a recreational storm chaser and contributed to Storm Track magazine. He was elected a Fellow of the American Meteorological Society in 1993.

Burgess is married and has two children.

== See also ==
- Leslie R. Lemon
