= Louis Wicker =

American meteorologist

Lou Wicker
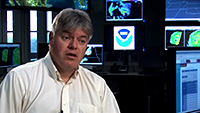
- Fielding questions on VORTEX2
- Born: October 31, 1961 (age 64)
- Education: University of Oklahoma (B.S., 1984; M.S., 1986); University of Illinois at Urbana–Champaign (Ph.D., 1990)
- Known for: Severe convective storms research
- Awards: Academy Award nominee
- Scientific career
- Fields: Meteorology
- Workplaces: University of Illinois at Urbana–Champaign; Texas A&M University; National Severe Storms Laboratory
- Thesis: A Numerical Study of a Tornado-Scale Vortex in a Three-Dimensional Cloud Model (1990)
- Doctoral advisor: Robert Wilhelmson
- Other academic advisors: Tzvi Gal-Chen
- Website: www.nssl.noaa.gov/users/lwicker/public_html/

Louis John Wicker (born October 31, 1961) is an American atmospheric scientist with expertise in numerical analysis, numerical simulation, and forecasts of severe convection and tornadoes. Doing storm chasing field research, Wicker deployed the TOtable Tornado Observatory (TOTO) and was in leadership roles in the VORTEX projects. He is also known for pioneering work simulating convection at the National Center for Supercomputing Applications (NCSA) at the University of Illinois at Urbana–Champaign (UIUC).

Wicker earned a B.S. and M.S. in meteorology from the University of Oklahoma (OU) in 1984 and 1986, respectively, with the masters thesis: A Simulation Study of a Data Assimilation Scheme Designed for VAS Temperature Soundings. He was awarded a Ph.D. in atmospheric sciences from UIUC in 1990 with the doctoral dissertation: A Numerical Study of a Tornado-Scale Vortex in a Three-Dimensional Cloud Model. From 1990-1992 he was a Visiting Associate Research Scientist at the Department of Atmospheric Sciences at UIUC and at NCSA. Wicker was a professor at Texas A&M University (TAMU) from 1992-1999. In 1999 he joined the National Severe Storms Laboratory (NSSL) as a research meteorologist and is a Fellow of the Cooperative Institute for Mesoscale Meteorological Studies (CIMMS). He is also an affiliate professor in the School of Meteorology at OU. He was on the steering committee and was a principal investigator (PI) of VORTEX2, the field phase of which occurred from 2009-2010.
