= Forces of Nature (2004 film) =

2004 documentary film by Sean Casey

- DVD cover.
- Directed by: George Casey
- Produced by: George Casey, Greg Eliason, Tim Kelly, Erica Meehan, Amiel G. Najar, Paul Novros, Lisa Truitt
- Narrated by: Kevin Bacon
- Music by: Sam Cardon
- Production companies: Graphic Films; National Geographic Society
- Release date: 2004
- Running time: 89 minutes
- Country: United States
- Language: English

Forces of Nature is a 2004 American IMAX 3D documentary film about strong forces that shape the Earth's surface. It is produced by the National Geographic Society, and includes coverage of

- Earthquakes - a history of earthquakes in Turkey, by Ross Stein.
- Volcanoes - a volcanic eruption on the island on Montserrat, by volcanologist Dr. Marie Edmonds.
- Tornadoes - chasing tornadoes in the Midwestern United States, by Joshua Wurman and a team of tornado chasers.

It is directed by George Casey and narrated by Kevin Bacon.
