= Erik N. Rasmussen =

American meteorologist (born 1957)

Erik Rasmussen
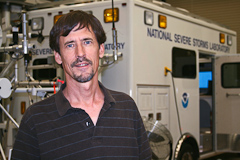
- Born: January 27, 1957 (age 69)
- Education: University of Oklahoma (B.S., 1980); Texas Tech University (M.S., 1982); Colorado State University (Ph.D., 1992)
- Known for: Supercell and tornadogenesis research, field project leadership
- Awards: Presidential Early Career Award for Scientists and Engineers
- Scientific career
- Fields: Meteorology
- Workplaces: NSSL, CIMMS, Rasmussen Systems
- Thesis: Observational and Theoretical Study of Squall Line Evolution (1992)
- Doctoral advisor: Steve Rutledge

Erik Nels Rasmussen (born January 27, 1957) is an American meteorologist and leading expert on mesoscale meteorology, severe convective storms, forecasting of storms, and tornadogenesis. He was the field coordinator of the first of the VORTEX projects in 1994-1995 and a lead principal investigator for VORTEX2 from 2009 to 2010 and VORTEX-SE from 2016 to 2017, as well as involved in other smaller VORTEX offshoots and many field projects.

== Biography ==
=== Education ===
Rasmussen was born in Hutchinson, Kansas to James and Ilse Rasmussen in 1957. His younger brother Neal, a software engineer, is also a storm chaser and is an accomplished videographer and photographer.

Rasmussen's undergraduate meteorology study was at the University of Oklahoma (OU) in Norman where he received a B.Sc. in 1980. Here he was introduced to field research under Howard Bluestein, chasing supercells and tornadoes, and learning about thunderstorm structure and processes. He went on to graduate school at Texas Tech University (TTU) in Lubbock where he earned a M.Sc. in atmospheric sciences in 1982. In grad school he developed a reputation as a particularly adept forecaster and interceptor of severe storms and tornadoes and was nicknamed "The Dryline Kid" in reference to the dry line which initiates isolated storms and attendant tornadoes. His thesis was The Tulia Outbreak Storm: Mesoscale Evolution and Photogrammetric Analysis.

From 1982 to 1984, Rasmussen pursued further postgraduate work at the University of Illinois at Urbana-Champaign (UIUC). He worked at W.A.R.N. Inc., Now Weather Inc., WeatherData Inc., and PROFS (which became the Forecast Systems Laboratory or FSL before that unit was merged into the Earth System Research Laboratories or ESRL). He finished his Ph.D. at Colorado State University (CSU) in Ft. Collins in 1992. At CSU he participated in more field work, including researching squall lines in Australia and his dissertation was titled Observational and Theoretical Study of Squall Line Evolution.

=== Career ===
Rasmussen became a research meteorologist at the National Severe Storms Laboratory (NSSL) and then the Cooperative Institute for Mesoscale Meteorological Studies (CIMMS). After the study of squall lines his interest returned to supercells from the microphysical aspects of cloud particles to mesoscale environments modulating storm behavior. He was the field commander (FC) of Project VORTEX in 1994-1995 where he worked with lead forecaster Charles A. Doswell III, participated in SUB-VORTEX and VORTEX-99, STEPS, IHOP, and served on the steering committee and was a lead principal investigator (PI) for VORTEX2 in 2009-2010 as well as project manager for VORTEX-SE in 2016-2017.

Since his college days Rasmussen was a major contributor to Storm Track magazine although by the mid-1990s his previously intense interest in storm chasing was waning. For years he did research and computer programming through his company Rasmussen Systems located near Grand Junction, Colorado. This work remains supported by the National Science Foundation (NSF) and he consults for NSSL and CIMMS, private meteorological companies, and other entities. In 2015 Rasmussen moved back to Norman, where he continues this aforementioned work and serves as Program Manager for the VORTEX-SE project.

== See also ==
- Robert Davies-Jones
- David Dowell
- Katharine Kanak
- Paul Markowski
- Jerry Straka
- Joshua Wurman
