= TOtable Tornado Observatory =

Tornado observation device

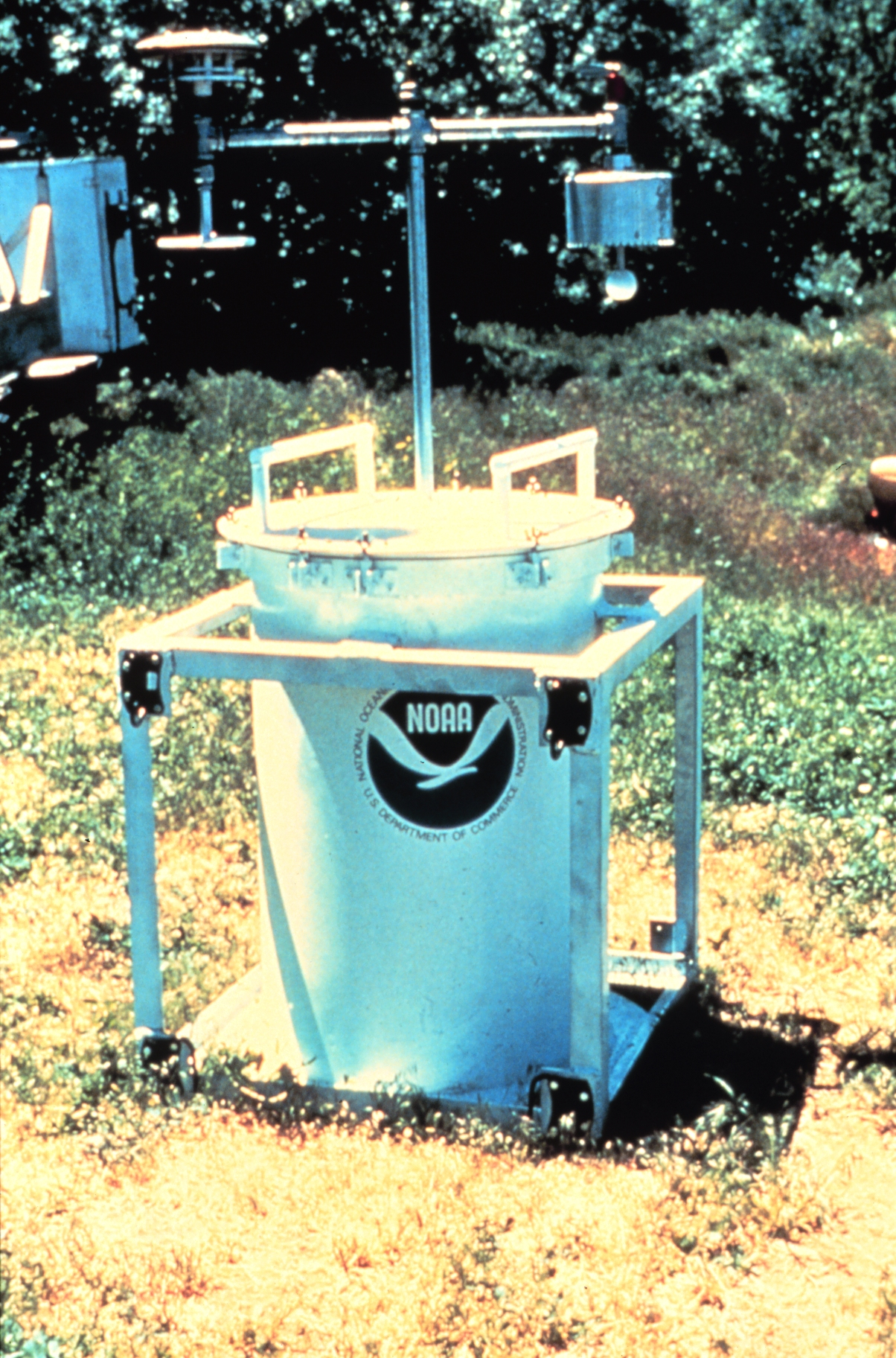
TOTO. An instrumented metal drum which scientists attempted to place in the path of tornadoes during the 1980s.

The TOtable Tornado Observatory (nicknamed "TOTO") is a large, instrumented barrel-shaped device invented in 1979 by engineers Dr. Al Bedard and Carl Ramzy of the National Oceanic and Atmospheric Administration (NOAA) Environmental Technology Laboratory (ETL), and Dr. Howard Bluestein, meteorologist at the University of Oklahoma (OU). NOAA's objective was to place the TOTO directly in the path of a tornado, where it could, theoretically, record valuable information about the tornado's structure.

To deploy TOTO, which weighed from 250 to 350 lbs (110–160 kg), two people could unstrap its mooring cables and roll it out of the back of a customized pickup truck in about thirty seconds, using metal wheel ramps. TOTO would then be tipped into a vertical position and swiveled so that a certain side faced north (for accurate wind direction readings). The TOTO crew had to quickly find a relatively level and firm surface, off the road, away from wind obstructions and potential debris generators (such as buildings and trees). With each deployment, there was also a heightened lightning strike risk from handling a large metal object in an open area.

TOTO was deployed several times during the 1980s. The closest deployment to a tornado was on April 29, 1985, near Ardmore, Oklahoma, by Steve Smith and Lou Wicker of the National Severe Storms Laboratory (NSSL). It turned out that TOTO had a center of gravity too high for extreme wind, and it fell down as it was sideswiped by the edge of the weak tornado.

TOTO was also deployed as a portable weather station to measure thunderstorm gust fronts and non-tornadic mesocyclones—with more success than its tornado mission. TOTO was retired after 1987 because of safety issues and the logistical difficulty of getting such a cumbersome object in front of a tornado.

TOTO is currently on display at the National Weather Center (NWC) on the University of Oklahoma campus in Norman, Oklahoma.

TOTO was the inspiration for an instrument package named "Dorothy" in the 1996 Warner Bros./Universal film, Twister, and for a research project in the TV movie Tornado!.

== See also ==
- Tornado Intercept Vehicle
- TWISTEX
- VORTEX projects
- List of United States government meteorology research projects
