= PERiLS Project =

The Propagation, Evolution, and Rotation in Linear Storms Project (PERiLS) was a field campaign led by the National Severe Storms Laboratory in 2022 and 2023 to study how tornadoes form within squall lines. The project was led by Daniel Dawson at Purdue University. The project was the first to study and observe tornadoes within quasi linear convective systems (QLCSs).

== Research ==
The project aimed to study the environments of QLCSs capable of producing tornadoes, while documenting mesocyclone formation and evolution within tornadic QLCSs. The project also studied damage produced by QLCSs. Anthony Lyza was a coordinating scientist on the PERiLS Project.

== Funding ==
The project was primarily funded by two grants provided by the National Oceanic and Atmospheric Administration:

- NOAA/DOC contract #1305M323PNRMA0093
- NOAA/DOC/TTU subaward #21B053-03

== See also ==
- List of United States government meteorology research projects
