= Journal of the Atmospheric Sciences =

- Discipline: Atmospheric sciences
- Language: English
- Edited by: Anne K. Smith

Publication details
- Former name(s): Journal of Meteorology
- History: 1944–present
- Publisher: American Meteorological Society (United States)
- Frequency: Monthly
- Open access: Delayed, 1 year
- Impact factor: 3.184 (2020)

Standard abbreviations
- ISO 4: J. Atmos. Sci.

Indexing
- ISSN: 0022-4928 (print); 1520-0469 (web)

Links
- Journal homepage; Online archive

The Journal of the Atmospheric Sciences (until 1962 titled Journal of Meteorology) is a scientific journal published by the American Meteorological Society. It covers research related to the physics, dynamics, and chemistry of the atmosphere of Earth and other planets, with emphasis on the quantitative and deductive aspects of the subject.

== See also ==
- List of scientific journals in earth and atmospheric sciences
