= Paul Markowski (meteorologist) =

American meteorologist

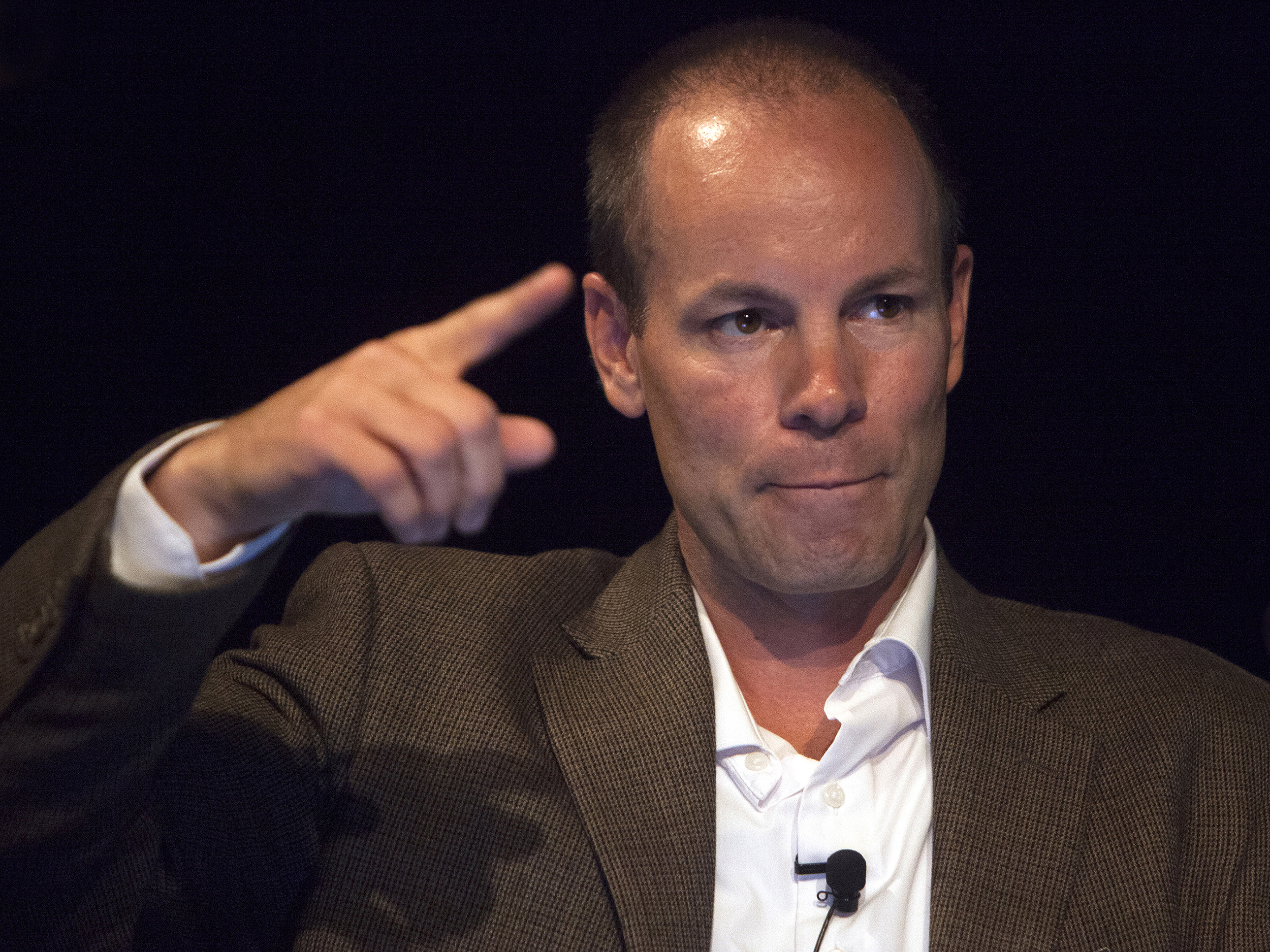
- Education: Pennsylvania State University (B.S., 1996); University of Oklahoma (M.S, 1997; Ph.D. 2000)
- Known for: Tornadogenesis research
- Awards: American Meteorological Society Clarence Leroy Meisinger Award, National Weather Association T. Theodore Fujita Research Achievement Award, European Severe Storms Laboratory Nikolai Dotzek Award, Penn State Alumni Achievement Award, American Meteorological Society Editor's Award, National Science Foundation Early Career Award, Fellow of American Meteorological Society
- Scientific career
- Fields: Meteorology
- Workplaces: Pennsylvania State University
- Thesis: Surface Thermodynamic Characteristics of Hook Echoes and Rear-Flank Downdrafts with Implications for Tornado Genesis and Maintenance (2000)
- Doctoral advisor: Jerry Straka
- Website: sites.psu.edu/pmarkowski

Paul M. Markowski is an American atmospheric scientist and leading expert on tornadogenesis and the prediction of supercells and tornadoes. He is a professor and department head in the Department of Meteorology and Atmospheric Science at Pennsylvania State University. Markowski is a Fellow of the American Meteorological Society and served as editor-in-chief of the society's Journal of Weather and Forecasting from 2012–2017.

== Career ==
Markowski developed an interest in meteorology after experiencing the 31 May 1985 tornado outbreak while growing up in Pennsylvania. Markowski attended Pennsylvania State University, graduating magna cum laude from Penn State's Schreyer Honors College with a B.S. in meteorology in 1996. He subsequently received an M.S. and Ph.D. in meteorology from the University of Oklahoma in 1997 and 2000, respectively. His doctoral research examined thermodynamic characteristics of downdrafts in supercell thunderstorms and their relationship to tornado formation.

After completing his doctoral studies, Markowski joined the faculty at Pennsylvania State University in 2001. He progressed through the academic ranks of assistant professor, associate professor, and professor, and was later appointed a distinguished professor. In 2023, he was named Head of the Department of Meteorology and Atmospheric Science.

Markowski was a principal investigator (PI) for the IHOP, (2002), PAMREX (2003–04), and VORTEX2 (2009–10) field projects and, with Joshua Wurman, Howard Bluestein, et al., was on the VORTEX2 Steering Committee. He has been interviewed widely by newspapers, magazines, television and radio.

Markowski has authored over 100 peer-reviewed articles in atmospheric science journals. He also authored, with Yvette Richardson, Mesoscale Meteorology in Midlatitudes, a widely popular textbook worldwide. In December 2013 Markowski lead authored with Harold Brooks, et al., a prominent op-ed rebuttal to physicist Richard Muller critiquing substantial methodological flaws in his findings that strong to violent tornado activity decreased in recent decades and his tying the stated decline to global warming.

== See also ==
- Erik N. Rasmussen
- Roger Wakimoto
- Ted Fujita
