= VORTEX projects =

Field experiments that study tornadoes

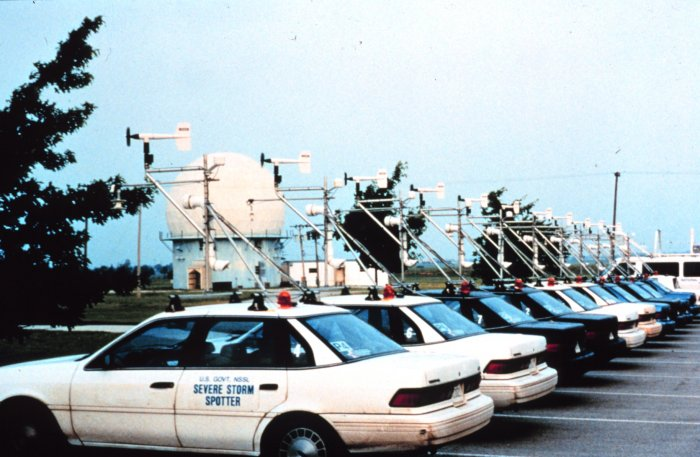
NSSL mobile mesonet vehicles of the first Project VORTEX, equipped with surface measurement equipment.

The Verification of the Origins of Rotation in Tornadoes Experiment (or VORTEX) are field experiments that study tornadoes. VORTEX1 was the first time scientists completely researched the entire evolution of a tornado with an array of instrumentation, enabling a greater understanding of the processes involved with tornadogenesis. A violent tornado near Union City, Oklahoma was documented in its entirety by chasers of the Tornado Intercept Project (TIP) in 1973. Their visual observations led to advancement in understanding of tornado structure and life cycles.

VORTEX2 used enhanced technology that allowed scientists to improve forecasting capabilities and improve lead time on advanced warnings to residents. VORTEX2 sought to reveal how tornadoes form, how long they last and why they last that long, and what causes them to dissipate.

VORTEX1 and VORTEX2 was based on the use of large fleets of instrumented vehicles that ran on land, as well as aircraft and mobile radars. Important work on developing and coordinating mobile mesonets came from these field projects. Analysis of data collected in subsequent years led to significant advancement in understanding of supercell and tornado morphology and dynamics. The field research phase of the VORTEX2 project concluded on July 6, 2010.

== VORTEX1 ==
VORTEX1
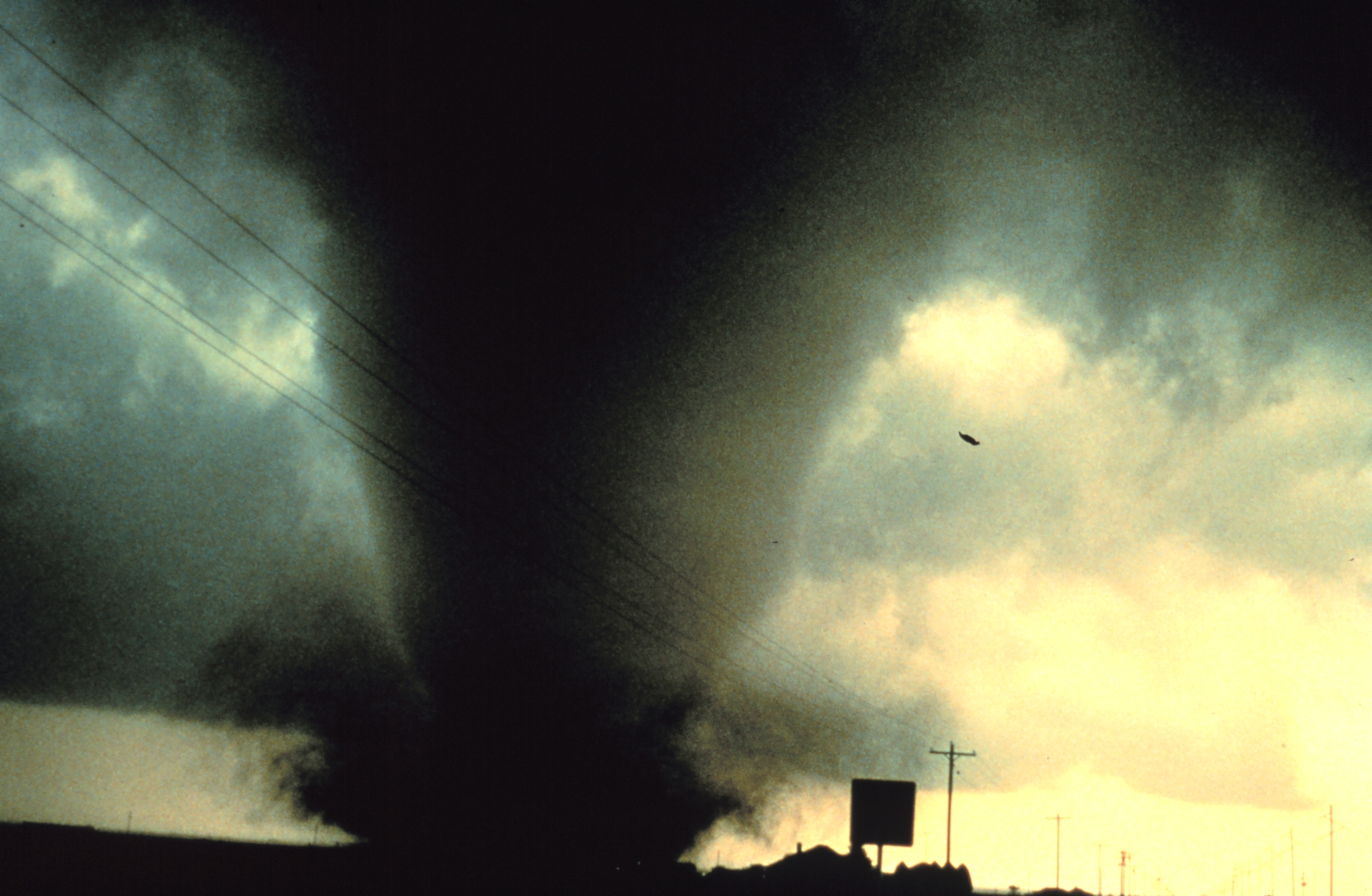
- Project Vortex. The Dimmitt tornado. National Severe Storms Laboratory (NSSL)
- Date: 1994 and 1995
- Location: Tornado Alley
- Also known as: Verification of the Origins of Rotation in Tornadoes Experiment 1
- Outcome: Documented an entire tornado, which, in conjunction with deployment of the NEXRAD system, helped the National Weather Service (NWS) to provide severe weather warnings with a thirteen-minute lead time, and reduce false alarms by ten percent.
- Website: http://vortex2.org/

The VORTEX1 project sought to understand how a tornado is produced by deploying tornado experts in around 18 vehicles that were equipped with customized instruments used to measure and analyze the weather around a tornado. As noted aircraft and radar resources were also deployed for such measurements. The project directors were also interested in why some supercells, or mesocyclones within such storms, produce tornadoes while others do not. It also sought to determine why some supercells form violent tornadoes versus weak tornadoes.

The original project took place in 1994 and 1995. Several smaller studies, such as SUB-VORTEX and VORTEX-99, were conducted from 1996 to 2008. VORTEX1 documented the entire life cycle of a tornado, for the first time measuring it by significant instrumentation for the entire event. Severe weather warnings improved after the research collected from VORTEX1, and many believe that VORTEX1 contributed to this improvement.

“An important finding from the original VORTEX experiment was that the factors responsible for causing tornadoes happen on smaller time and space scales than scientists had thought. New advances will allow for a more detailed sampling of a storm's wind, temperature, and moisture environment, and lead to a better understanding of why tornadoes form –-and how they can be more accurately predicted,” said Stephan Nelson, NSF program director for physical and dynamic meteorology.

VORTEX had the capability to fly Doppler weather radar above the tornado approximately every five minutes.

VORTEX research helped the National Weather Service (NWS) to provide tornado warnings to residents with a lead time of 13 minutes. A federal research meteorologist, Don Burgess, estimates that the "false alarms" pertaining to severe weather by the National Weather Service have declined by 10 percent.

The movie Twister was at least partially inspired by the VORTEX project.

== VORTEX2 ==
VORTEX2
- Date: 10 May 2009 – 13 June 2009 and 1 May 2010 – 15 June 2010
- Location: Tornado Alley
- Also known as: Verification of the Origins of Rotation in Tornadoes Experiment 2
- Website: http://vortex2.org/

VORTEX2 field command vehicle with tornado in sight. Wyoming, LaGrange. 2009

VORTEX2 was an expanded second VORTEX project, with field phases from 10 May until 13 June 2009 and 1 May until 15 June 2010. VORTEX2's goals were studying why some thunderstorms produce tornadoes while others do not, and learning about tornado structure, in order to make more accurate tornado forecasts and warnings with longer lead time. VORTEX2 was by far the largest and most ambitious tornado study ever with over 100 scientific participants from many different universities and research laboratories.

"We still do not completely understand the processes that lead to tornado formation and shape its development. We hope that VORTEX2 will provide the data we need to learn more about the development of tornadoes and in time help forecasters give people more advance warning before a tornado strikes," said Roger Wakimoto, director of the Earth Observing Laboratory (EOL) at the National Center for Atmospheric Research (NCAR) and a principal investigator for VORTEX2.

"Then you can get first responders to be better prepared—police, fire, medical personnel, even power companies. Now, that's not even remotely possible," said Stephan P. Nelson, a program director in the atmospheric sciences division of the National Science Foundation (NSF). Joshua Wurman, president of the Center for Severe Weather Research (CSWR) in Boulder, Colorado proposes, "if we can increase that lead time from 13 minutes to half an hour, then the average person at home could do something different. Maybe they can seek a community shelter instead of just going into their bathtub. Maybe they can get their family to better safety if we can give them a longer warning and a more precise warning."

VORTEX2 deployed 50 vehicles customized with mobile radar, including the Doppler On Wheels (DOW) radars, SMART radars, the NOXP radar, a fleet of instrumented vehicles, unmanned aerial vehicles (UAVs), deployable instrument arrays called Sticknet and Podnet, and mobile weather balloon launching equipment. More than 100 scientists and crew researched tornadoes and supercell thunderstorms in the "Tornado Alley" region of the United States' Great Plains between Texas and Minnesota. A number of institutions and countries were involved in the US$11.9 million project, including: the US National Oceanic and Atmospheric Administration (NOAA) and its National Weather Service and the Storm Prediction Center (SPC) therein, the Australian Bureau of Meteorology (BOM), Finland, Italy, the Netherlands, the United Kingdom, Environment Canada, and universities across the United States and elsewhere.

The project included DOW3, DOW6, DOW7, Rapid-Scan DOW, SMART-RADARs, NOXP, UMASS-X, UMASS-W, CIRPAS and TIV 2 for their mobile radar contingent. The Doppler on Wheels were supplied by the Center for Severe Weather Research, and the SMART-Radars from the University of Oklahoma (OU). The National Severe Storms Laboratory (NSSL) supplied the NOXP radar, as well as several other radar units from the University of Massachusetts Amherst, the Office of Naval Research (ONR), and Texas Tech University (TTU). NSSL, CSWR, and Environment Canada supplied mobile mesonet fleets. Mobile radiosonde launching vehicles were provided by NSSL, NCAR, and the State University of New York at Oswego (SUNY Oswego). There were quite a few other deployable state-of-the-art instrumentation, such as Sticknets from TTU, tornado PODS from CSWR, and four disdrometers from University of Colorado CU, and the University of Illinois at Urbana-Champaign (UIUC).

VORTEX2 technology allowed trucks with radar to be placed in and near tornadic storms and allowed continuous observations of the tornadic activity. Howard Bluestein, a meteorology professor at the University of Oklahoma said, "We will be able to distinguish between rain, hail, dust, debris, flying cows."

Additionally, photogrammetry teams, damage survey teams, unmanned aircraft, and weather balloon launching vans helped to surround the tornadoes and thunderstorms. The equipment amassed enabled three-dimensional data sets of the storms to be collected with radars and other instruments every 75 seconds (more frequently for some individual instruments), and resolution of the tornado and tornadic storm cells as close as 200 feet (61 m).

Scientists met May 10 and held a class to teach the crews how to launch the tornado pods, which would have to be released within 45 seconds of notification. VORTEX2 was equipped with 12 tornado PODS, instruments mounted onto 1 meter (3.3 ft) towers that measure wind velocity (i.e. speed and direction). The aim was that some of the measurements would be taken in the center of the tornado. Once the pods are deployed, the teams repeat the process at the next location until finally the teams return to the south of the tornado to retrieve the pods with the recorded data. The process is repeated. This takes place within 2 miles (3.2 km), or 4 minutes away from the tornado itself.

The team had twenty-four 2-meter (6.6 ft)-high portable Sticknets, which can be set up at various locations around tornado storm cells to measure wind fields, provide atmospheric readings, and record acoustically the hail and precipitation.

Scientists are still seeking to refine understanding of which supercell thunderstorms that form mesocyclones will eventually produce tornadoes, and by which processes, storm-scale interactions, and within which atmospheric environments.

A Doppler on Wheels radar loop of the tornado intercepted on June 5.

Updates on the progress of the project were posted on the VORTEX2 home page. The scientists also started a blog of live reports.

"Even though this field phase seems to be the most spectacular and seems like it's a lot of work, by far the majority of what we're doing is when we go back to our labs, when we work with each other, when we work with our students to try to figure out just what is it that we've collected," Wurman said. "It's going to take years to digest this data and to really get the benefit of this."

Penn State University featured the public release of the initial scientific findings in the fall.

The forecasters were determining the best probability of sighting a tornado. As the trucks traveled to Clinton, Oklahoma from Childress, Texas, they found mammatus clouds and lightning at sundown on May 13, 2009.

The project encountered its first tornado on the afternoon of June 5 when they successfully intercepted a tornado in southern Goshen County, Wyoming, which lasted for approximately 25 minutes. One of their vehicles, Probe 1, suffered hail damage during the intercept. Later that evening, embedded Weather Channel (TWC) reporter Mike Bettes reported that elements of VORTEX2 had intercepted a second tornado in Nebraska. Placement of the armada for this tornado was nearly ideal. It was surrounded for its entire life cycle, making it the most thoroughly observed tornado in history.

=== Partial list of scientists and crew ===
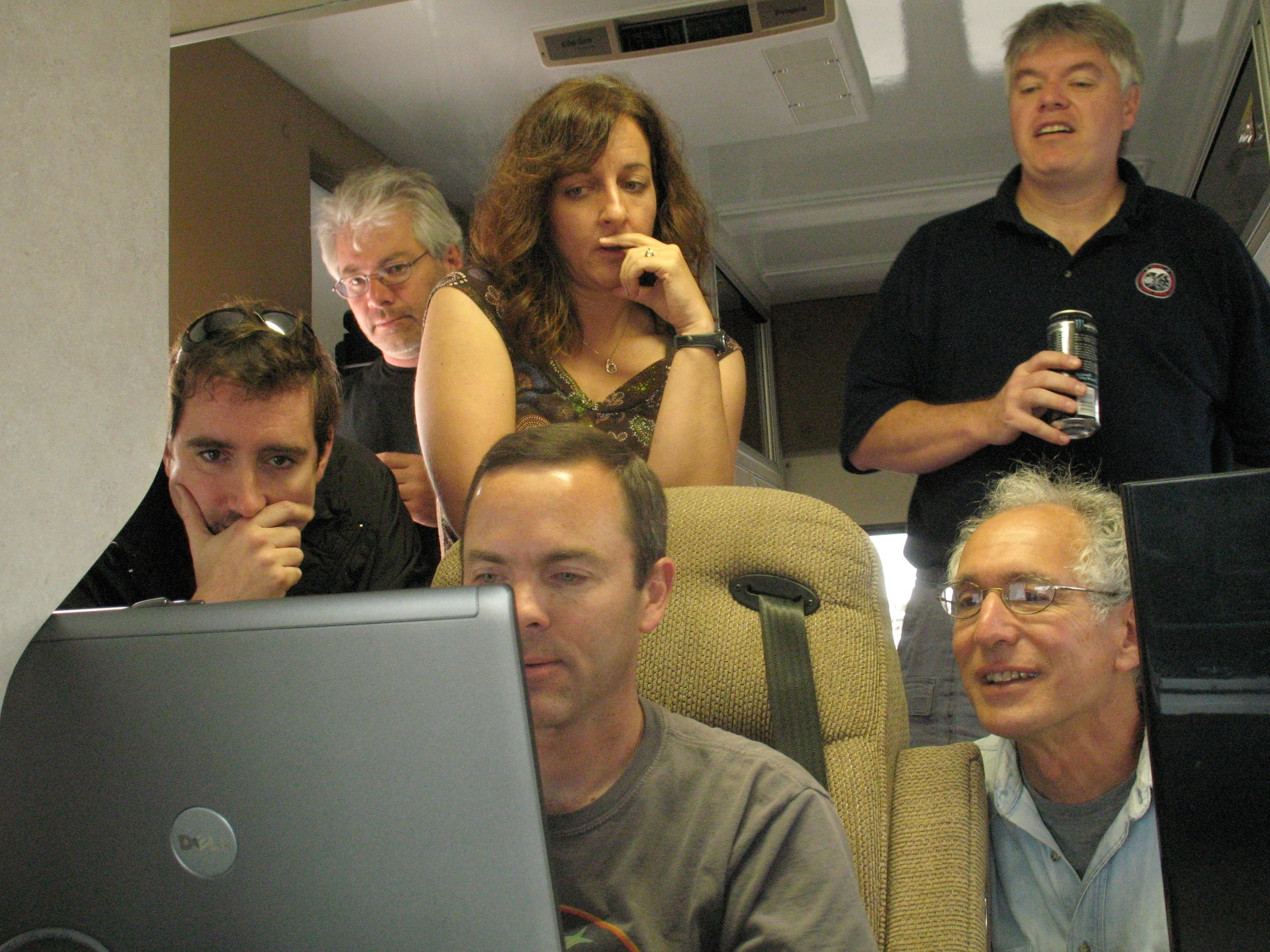
VORTEX2 principal investigators plot the next step from the Field Command Vehicle (FCV). Left to right, Chris Weiss (TTU), Joshua Wurman (CSWR), Yvette Richardson (PSU), David Dowell (NCAR), Howard Bluestein (OU), and Lou Wicker (NSSL).

The complete team comprises about 50 scientists and is supplemented by students. A complete listing of principal investigators (PIs) is at http://vortex2.org/. An alphabetical partial listing of VORTEX2 scientists and crew:

- Nolan Atkins, Scientific PI, Professor Lyndon State College.
- Michael Biggerstaff, Scientific PI, Professor, University of Oklahoma, expertise is in polarimetric radars, mobile radars, cloud physics and electrification, tropical cyclones (hurricanes), severe local storms, and storm dynamics. He is the Director of the SMART radar program at OU.
- Howard Bluestein, Steering Committee, Scientific PI, Professor University of Oklahoma specializes in violent weather phenomena and provides expertise with Doppler weather radar. He is a professor in meteorology.
- Donald W. Burgess, Steering Committee, Scientific PI, Scientist at CIMMS.
- David Dowell, Steering Committee, Scientific PI, Scientist, National Center for Atmospheric Research.
- Jeffrey Frame, Professor University of Illinois at Urbana-Champaign, expert in severe convection.
- Katja Friedrich, Scientific PI, Associate Professor, University of Colorado.
- Karen Kosiba, Scientific PI, is a senior research meteorologist at the Center for Severe Weather Research.
- Timothy P. Marshall, P.E. is a damage analyst with a background in civil/structural engineering and meteorology.
- Paul Markowski, Steering Committee, Scientific PI, associate professor in meteorology at Pennsylvania State University, specializes in severe storm dynamics.
- Matthew Parker, Scientific PI, Mobile Soundings Coordinator, Associate Professor of meteorology at North Carolina State University. Specializes in the dynamics of convective storms, including tornadic supercells and mesoscale convective systems (MCSs).
- Erik N. Rasmussen, Steering Committee, Scientific PI, VORTEX2 co-PI, Atmospheric Scientist and VORTEX1 field director, Rasmussen Systems.
- Yvette Richardson, Steering Committee, Scientific PI, associate professor in meteorology at Pennsylvania State University, specializes in severe storm dynamics.
- Glen Romine, Scientific PI, Project Scientist, National Center for Atmospheric Research.
- Paul Robinson is a senior research meteorologist at the Center for Severe Weather Research.
- Roger Wakimoto, Scientific PI, Director National Center for Atmospheric Research.
- Chris Weiss, Scientific PI, Associate Professor, Texas Tech University.
- Louis Wicker is a research scientist with a specialty in modeling of severe storm dynamics. He was also a co-team leader in VORTEX1. National Severe Storms Laboratory.
- Joshua Wurman Steering Committee, Scientific PI, VORTEX2 PI, president at the Center for Severe Weather Research with a specialty in mobile Doppler weather radar, invented and leads the Doppler On Wheels (DOW) program.

== Smaller projects ==
Other smaller field projects include the previously mentioned SUB-VORTEX (1997–98) and VORTEX-99 (1999), and VORTEX-Southeast (VORTEX-SE) (2016-2019).

== See also ==
- List of United States government meteorology research projects
- TOtable Tornado Observatory (TOTO)
- TWISTEX
- Mobile radar observation of tornadoes
