= Howard Bluestein =

American research meteorologist

Howie Bluestein
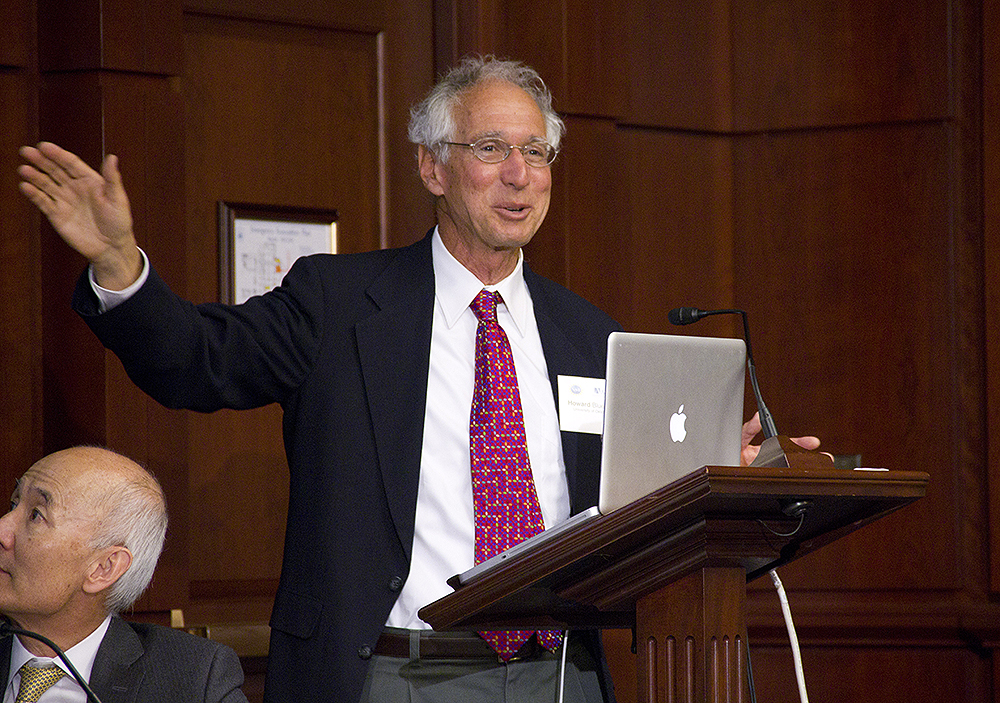
- Born: Boston, Massachusetts, US
- Education: MIT (B.S. 1971, M.S. 1972, Ph.D. 1976)
- Known for: Mobile Doppler radars; VORTEX projects 1 and 2
- Awards: Louis J. Battan's Author's Award
- Scientific career
- Fields: Meteorology
- Workplaces: University of Oklahoma School of Meteorology
- Thesis: Synoptic-scale Deformation and Tropical Cloud Bands (1976)
- Doctoral advisor: Fred Sanders
- Doctoral students: Robin Tanamachi; David Dowell
- Website: weather.ou.edu/~hblue/

Howard Bruce Bluestein is a research meteorologist known for his mesoscale meteorology, severe weather, and radar research. He is a major participant in the VORTEX projects. A native of the Boston area, Dr. Bluestein received his Ph.D. in 1976 from MIT. He served as a professor of meteorology at the University of Oklahoma (OU) from 1976 to 2025, retiring at the start of January 2026.

== Background ==
Bluestein's masters thesis was Prediction of Satellite Cloud Patterns Using Spatial Fourier Transforms and his doctoral dissertation was Synoptic-scale Deformation and Tropical Cloud Bands. He is the George Lynn Cross Research Professor at the OU School of Meteorology. He was on the steering committee and was a principal investigator (PI) for VORTEX2, the field phase of which occurred from 2009-2010. Bluestein is a Fellow of the American Meteorological Society (AMS), served on the National Research Council (NRC) Board of Atmospheric Sciences and Climate (BASC) and on the NRC Committee on Weather Radar Technology Beyond NEXRAD.

Bluestein authored Synoptic-Dynamic Meteorology in Midlatitudes: Vol. 1: Principles of Kinematics and Dynamics (ISBN 978-0195062670) in 1992, Synoptic-Dynamic Meteorology in Midlatitudes: Volume II: Observations and Theory of Weather Systems (ISBN 978-0195062687) in 1993, and Severe Convective Storms and Tornadoes: Observations and Dynamics in (ISBN 978-3642053801) 2013. He co-edited, with Lance Bosart, Synoptic-Dynamic Meteorology and Weather Analysis and Forecasting: A Tribute to Fred Sanders (ISBN 978-1878220844) in 2008. He wrote the popular book Tornado Alley: Monster Storms of the Great Plains (ISBN 978-0195105520) in 1999. Howie "Cb" Bluestein, a nickname that is the abbreviation for cumulonimbus, has been a contributor to Storm Track and Weatherwise magazines.

Bluestein is noted for his co-invention of the tornado-measuring device TOTO, with Al Bedard and Carl Ramzy of NOAA,

== See also ==
- Joshua Wurman
