= Joshua Wurman =

American meteorologist (born 1960)

Josh Wurman
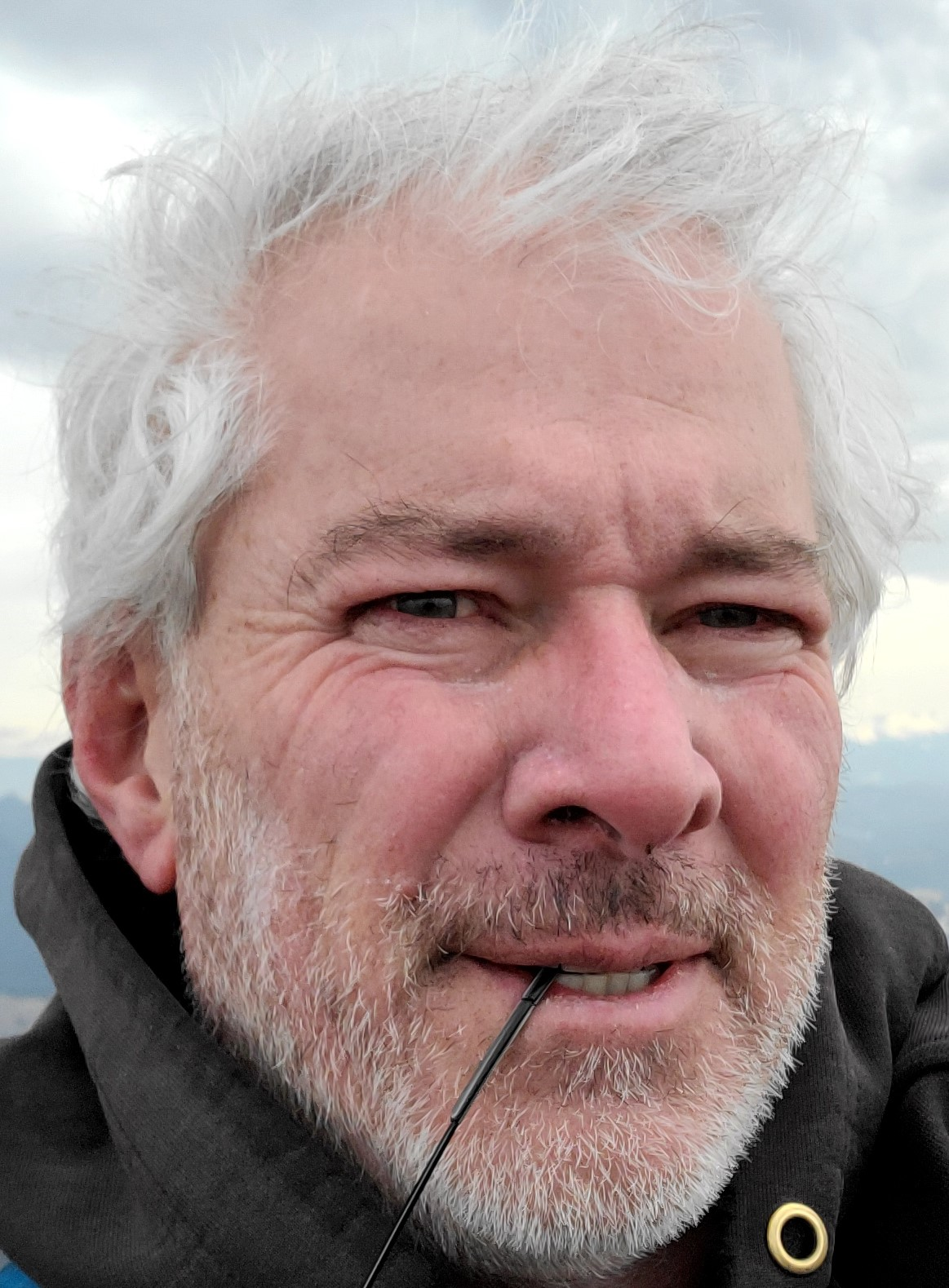
- Joshua Wurman, creator of DOW
- Born: October 1, 1960 (age 65); Philadelphia, Pennsylvania, US
- Citizenship: United States
- Education: Massachusetts Institute of Technology (S.B., 1982; S.M., 1982; Sc.D., 1991)
- Known for: Weather radar, tornado, and hurricane research; field research and inventions
- Spouse: Ling Chen
- Scientific career
- Fields: Atmospheric sciences
- Workplaces: National Center for Atmospheric Research University of Illinois Urbana-Champaign; University of Oklahoma; Center for Severe Weather Research
- Thesis: Forcing Mechanisms of Thunderstorm Downdrafts (1991)
- Doctoral advisor: Earle Williams
- Other academic advisors: Raymond Pierrehumbert; Fred Sanders

Joshua Michael Aaron Ryder Wurman (born October 1, 1960) is an American atmospheric scientist and inventor known for creating the Doppler on Wheels and pioneering tornado, tropical cyclone, and weather radar research. He currently serves as the executive director of the FARM Facility and has served as a principal investigator for various field projects including ROTATE, IHOP, and VORTEX 2.

== Early life and education ==
He attended Radnor High School in Radnor, Pennsylvania. He earned a S.B. in physics and interdisciplinary science in 1982, a S.M. in meteorology in 1982, and a Sc.D. in meteorology in 1991, all from MIT. His masters thesis was The Long Range Dispersion of Radioactive Particulates and his doctoral dissertation was Forcing Mechanisms of Thunderstorm Downdrafts.

== Career ==
He moved to Boulder, Colorado, to work at the National Center for Atmospheric Research (NCAR) and later to Norman, Oklahoma, where he was a tenured faculty member at the University of Oklahoma (OU). He founded the (CSWR) in 1998. Wurman returned to Boulder in 2001. He and the Doppler On Wheels (DOW) facility, updated as the Flexible Array of Radars and Mesonets (FARM) are currently affiliated with the University of Alabama-Huntsville . Joshua Wurman's father is noted architect and founder of the TED conferences, Richard Saul Wurman.

=== Research ===
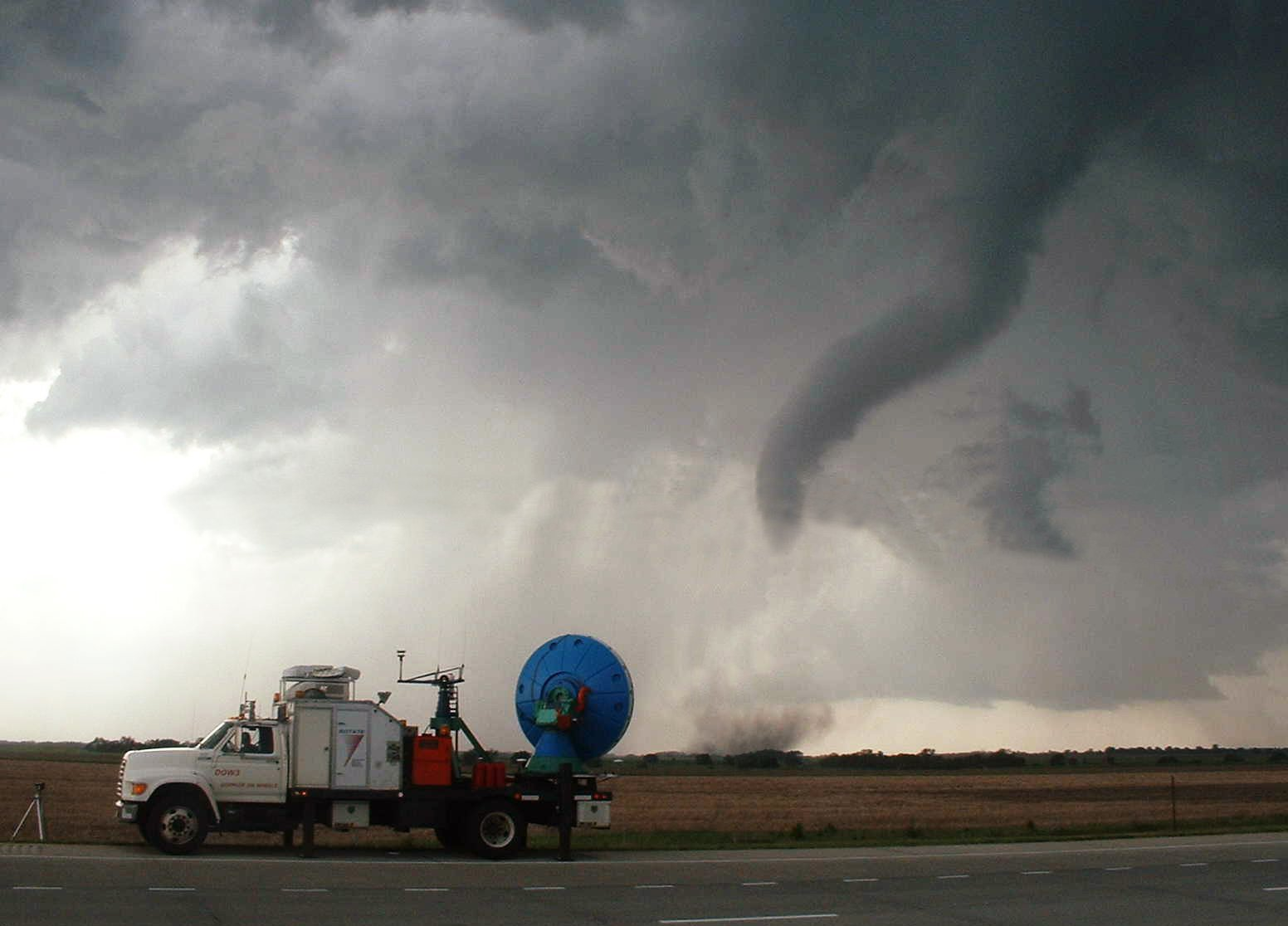
A Doppler On Wheels chasing a tornado near Attica, Kansas

Wurman is particularly interested in researching tornadogenesis and amassing sufficient datasets of tornado structure and dynamics observations for tornado climatology study. He is also the discoverer of sub-kilometer hurricane boundary layer rolls, and hurricane tornado-scale vortices (TSV), and wrote the pioneering papers on mapping tornado winds, multiple vortices, and other tornado-related phenomena. He has led DOW observational studies of wildfires and eclipses.

Joshua Wurman participated in both the VORTEX projects, doing early deployments of the first scraped together DOW radars for VORTEX1 and served on the steering committee and was a principal investigator (PI) for VORTEX2, the field research phase of which occurred from 2009 to 2010. Wurman's team observed the top two fastest wind events and two contenders for the largest tornado circulations. He leads the ROTATE (Radar Observations of Tornadoes And Thunderstorms Experiment) tornado observational project every spring and hurricane intercepts in the fall. A current major project of his is studying lake-effect snow in the OWLeS.

Wurman has authored and co-authored many scientific publications relating to hurricane and tornado dynamics and weather radar technology including two articles in Science, articles in the Journal of the Atmospheric Sciences, Monthly Weather Review, Journal of Atmospheric and Oceanic Technology, Weather and Forecasting, Proceedings of the National Academy of Sciences and others. He authored an article in the Bulletin of the American Meteorological Society analyzing the potential impacts of a major tornado passing through urban areas. He authored in PNAS the first comprehensive observation-based climatology of tornadoes, revealing that they are much stronger than damage surveys suggest. He authored an article linking DOW-mapped Hurricane Tornado-Scale Vortices (TSV) to extreme wind gusts and damage

=== Radar innovations ===
Wurman and his team developed the DOW radars, a new concept of mobile radar, used to observe tornadoes, tropical cyclones, wildfires, winter storms, and other phenomena from close range. He built the first DOW in 1995 from spare parts from NCAR and other facilities and as of March 2014 has built eight DOW units. The success of the DOWs led to a revolution of mobile radars in severe storms and other meteorological field research. The Flexible Array of Radars and Mesonets (FARM) incorporates the DOWs FARM Facility Website

Furthermore, they developed meteorological bistatic radar multiple-Doppler networks, and the Rapid-Scan DOW, and holds about several patents related to bistatic and DOW technology. He founded BINET Inc., manufacturer of Bistatic Networks, in 1995.

Wurman invented the first quickly-deployable narrow beam (1 degree) C-band radar, the C-band On Wheels (COW) and has proposed a network of S-band On Wheels (SOWs) to be incorporated into the Flexible Array of Radars and Mesonets (FARM).

=== National profile ===
He directs the DOW radar network which is a National Science Foundation (NSF) Community Instrumentation Facility, a core part of the Flexible Array of Radars and Mesonets (FARM), which is based in Boulder and affiliated with the University of Illinois. His scientific work and DOW projects are largely sponsored by NSF, as well as National Oceanic and Atmospheric Administration (NOAA), the United States Forest Service (USFS), the United States Department of Energy (DOE), the Federal Aviation Administration (FAA), and other agencies of the U.S. government, as well as by The Discovery Channel, and the National Geographic Society, among others.

Wurman is in the USA Science and Engineering Festival's Nifty Fifty, a collection of the most influential scientists and engineers in the United States that are dedicated to reinvigorating the interest of young people in science and engineering.

== In popular culture ==
Wurman has appeared in many television shows and his work, particularly with the DOWs, and is cited in numerous popular and technical books about weather. He is best known to the general public as the "scientist" in The Discovery Channel's reality series Storm Chasers, where he led a group of storm chasers conducting research during tornado season. CSWR worked with Sean Casey's Tornado Intercept Vehicle (TIV) combining in situ intercept data and photogrammetry work with DOW remote sensing data. His scientific research style is often shown clashing with other chasers who are not government funded.

He was also featured on National Geographic Channel's Tornado Intercept and The True Face of Hurricanes, as well as in the IMAX film Forces of Nature. He's also been seen in several other documentaries and shows including those on PBS' Nova and NewsHour, NHK, BBC, History Channel, and The Weather Channel (TWC), and on Dateline NBC, CBS' 48 Hours, Larry King Live, Nightline, and Good Morning America.

Popular articles describing his work have appeared in Discover, Scientific American, New Scientist, The Economist, Biography, Newsweek, Time, FHM, Self, The New York Times, USA Today, The Washington Post, and many other publications.

== See also ==
- Doppler On Wheels
- Howard Bluestein
- Paul Markowski
- Erik N. Rasmussen
- Roger Wakimoto
