= Cooperative Institute for Severe and High-Impact Weather Research and Operations =

American atmospheric research organization

- Abbreviation: CIWRO
- Established: 1978 (48 years ago)
- Coordinates: 35°10′53″N 97°26′24″W
- Employees: 215 (2023)
- Website: ciwro.ou.edu

The Cooperative Institute for Severe and High-Impact Weather Research and Operations (CIWRO) is one of sixteen NOAA Cooperative Institutes (CIs), hosted at the University of Oklahoma. Before Oct. 1, 2021, it was known as the Cooperative Institute for Mesoscale Meteorological Studies (CIMMS). The CIMMS/CIWRO, a research organization created in 1978 by a cooperative agreement between the University of Oklahoma and NOAA, promotes collaborative research between NOAA and OU scientists on problems of mutual interest to improve basic understanding of mesoscale meteorological phenomena, weather radar, and regional climate to help produce better forecasts and warnings that save lives and property. CIMMS/CIWRO research contributes to the NOAA mission through improvement of the observation, analysis, understanding, and prediction of weather elements and systems and climate anomalies ranging in size from cloud nuclei to multi-state areas.

== Mission ==
CIMMS/CIWRO concentrates its research and outreach efforts and resources on the following principal themes:.

- Weather radar research and development
- Stormscale and mesoscale modeling research and development
- Forecast improvements research and development
- Impacts of climate change related to extreme weather events
- Social and socioeconomic impacts of high impact weather systems

== National Weather Center ==
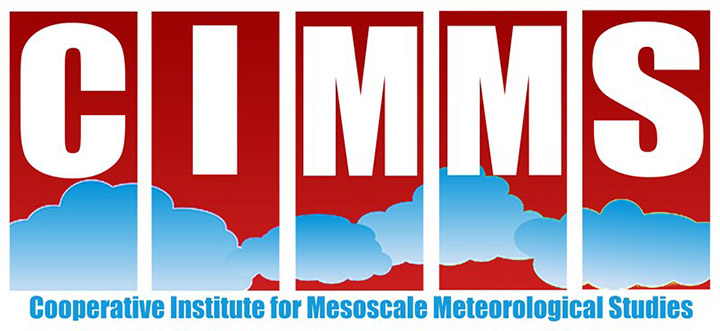
Logo of predecessor CIMMS.

CIMMS/CIWRO is part of the National Weather Center, a unique confederation of federal, state, and OU organizations that work together in partnership to improve understanding of the Earth's atmosphere. Recognized for its collective expertise in severe weather, many of the research and development activities of the Center have served society by improving weather observing and forecasting, and thus have contributed to reductions in loss of life and property. Many entities of the National Weather Center played a key role in the decade-long, $2 billion modernization and restructuring of the National Weather Service. National Weather Center organizations employ 650 individuals and provide more than $45 million annually to the Oklahoma economy. Today, all organizations are collocated in the new National Weather Center facility, which was completed in 2006 at a cost of $69 million.

== Collaboration ==
CIMMS/CIWRO promotes cooperation and collaboration on problems of mutual interest among OU research scientists and students and the NOAA Office of Oceanic and Atmospheric Research (OAR) National Severe Storms Laboratory, NOAA Air Resources Laboratory, National Weather Service Radar Operations Center for the WSR-88D (NEXRAD) Program, NWS National Centers for Environmental Prediction Storm Prediction Center, NWS Warning Decision Training Division, the NWS Forecast Office in Norman, Oklahoma, and the NWS Training Center located in Kansas City, Missouri.
