= Jeff Kimpel =

American meteorologist (1942–2020)

James F. "Jeff" Kimpel
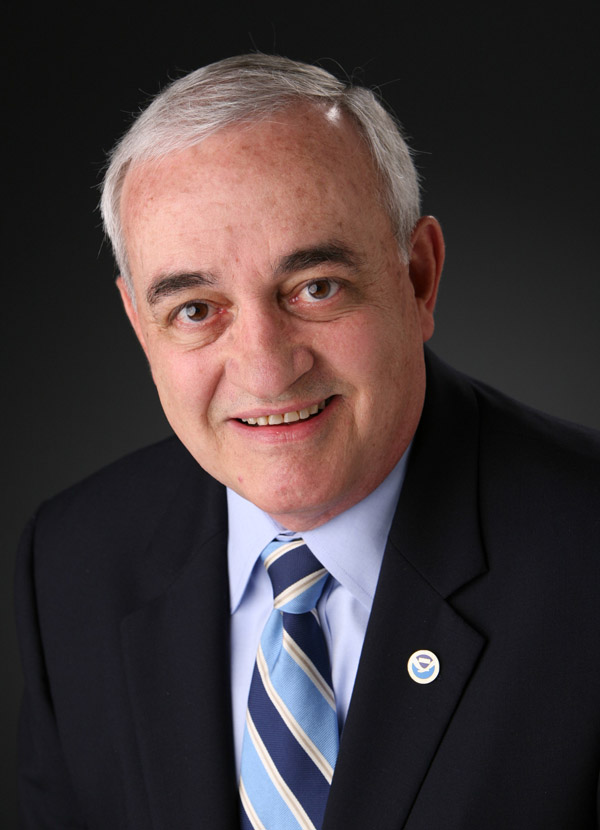
- Born: April 18, 1942; Cincinnati, Ohio, U.S.
- Died: February 22, 2020 (aged 77)
- Education: Denison University (1964); University of Wisconsin–Madison (PhD, 1973)
- Known for: Director of NSSL
- Scientific career
- Fields: Meteorology
- Workplaces: University of Oklahoma (OU); National Severe Storms Laboratory (NSSL)

James F. "Jeff" Kimpel (April 18, 1942 – February 22, 2020) was an American atmospheric scientist with expertise on severe storms who was a provost of the University of Oklahoma (OU) and director of the National Severe Storms Laboratory (NSSL).

Kimpel was born in Cincinnati, Ohio. He earned a bachelor's degree in psychology from Denison University in 1964. He served in the Air Force in the Vietnam War, where he was awarded a Bronze Star Medal. Kimpel went to the University of Wisconsin–Madison for graduate studies and was awarded a Ph.D. in meteorology in 1973. He joined the faculty of OU in 1973, was named director of the School of Meteorology in 1981, became dean of the College of Geosciences in 1987, and was a director of Weather Center Programs and a senior vice president of the university before an appointment as provost of the Norman campus in 1992. Kimpel was the third director of NSSL, from 1997–2010.

At NSSL, he was known for overseeing the development of a weather radar Hazardous Testbed and phased array Doppler radar, as well as coalition building such as that which led to the formation of the National Weather Center (NWC). Kimpel was elected as a Fellow of the American Meteorological Society (AMS) in 1989 and as president of the organization in 2000. He also was on the Board of Trustees of the University Corporation for Atmospheric Research (UCAR), the National Science Foundation (NSF)'s Advisory Committee for Atmospheric Sciences, and the National Weather Service NCEP Advisory Panel. Additionally, he was President of Applied Systems Institute, Inc from 1985-1988.

Kimpel retired from NSSL in 2010. Kimpel died on February 22, 2020.

== See also ==
- David Atlas
- Donald W. Burgess
- Leslie R. Lemon
- Roger Lhermitte
