= DaNa Carlis =

American meteorologist

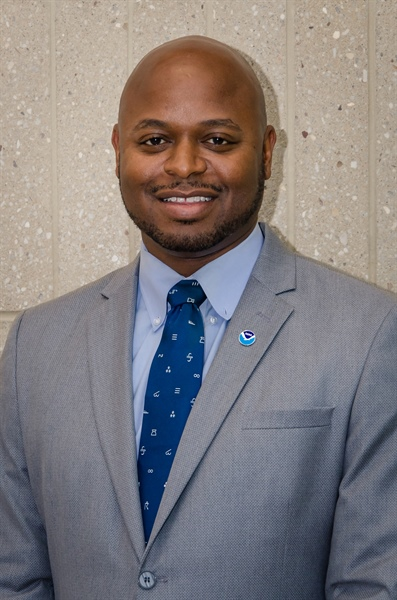
- Born: Tulsa, Oklahoma, U.S.
- Education: Howard University
- Scientific career
- Fields: Meteorology
- Workplaces: NOAA National Severe Storms Laboratory NOAA Global Systems Laboratory NOAA Weather Program Office NOAA National Centers for Environmental Prediction Environmental Modeling Center
- Thesis: Numerical simulations of island-scale airflow and the Maui vortex under summer trade-wind conditions (2007)
- Doctoral advisor: Vernon R. Morris

DaNa L. Carlis (/ˈdəneɪ ˈkɑːrlɪs/ də-NAY KAR-lis) is an American meteorologist and director of the NOAA National Severe Storms Laboratory (NSSL) in Norman, Oklahoma. He is the first African American to serve as the head of a NOAA research laboratory.

== Early life and education ==
Carlis was born and raised in Tulsa, Oklahoma. He attended Carver Middle School and Booker T. Washington High School, where, in 2018, he was inducted to the school's Distinguished Hall of Fame.

He attended Howard University, where he received a Bachelor of Science degree in chemistry, as well as Master of Science and PhD degrees in atmospheric sciences, studying under Vernon Morris, founder of Atmospheric Science Program at Howard. He was the second African American male to receive a PhD from the program.

Carlis credits his relationship with Dr. Gary Davis, one of the few African American physicians in Tulsa at the time and the father of a close friend, for inspiring him to pursue a career in science.

== Career ==
Carlis began working for NOAA while in graduate school, conducting research on modeling airflow over the island of Maui and implementing semi-operational weather models over the Hawaiian Islands. This led to the publication of a research paper in the journal Monthly Weather Review, with Yi-Leng Chen, of the University of Hawaii Department of Atmospheric Sciences, and Morris serving as second and third authors.

After completing his PhD, Carlis held positions at the National Weather Service (NWS) Honolulu Weather Forecast Office, as well as the agency's Pacific Region Headquarters, before returning to the mainland United States, where he held several positions at the NWS National Centers for Environmental Prediction (NCEP) Environmental Modeling Center (EMC) from 2007 to 2014. From 2014 to 2016, he served as a policy advisor to the NOAA chief scientist and the NOAA assistant secretary of commerce for environmental observation and prediction. In 2016, he began working at the NOAA Weather Program Office (WPO), part of the agency's Office of Oceanic and Atmospheric Research (OAR), where he founded the Earth Prediction Innovation Center (EPIC) and Next-Generation Global Prediction System (NGGPS) programs. In September 2020, he became deputy director of the NOAA Global Systems Laboratory (GSL).

In 2023, Carlis was named the sixth director of NSSL, where he leads a team of scientists working to advance the science and technology of severe weather forecasting and warnings in an effort to improve accuracy and lead times. As director in 2025, Carlis oversaw the formal transition of the Warn of foreacst system, a tool capable of providing tornado alerts with up to two hours notice to the National weather service for demonstration.

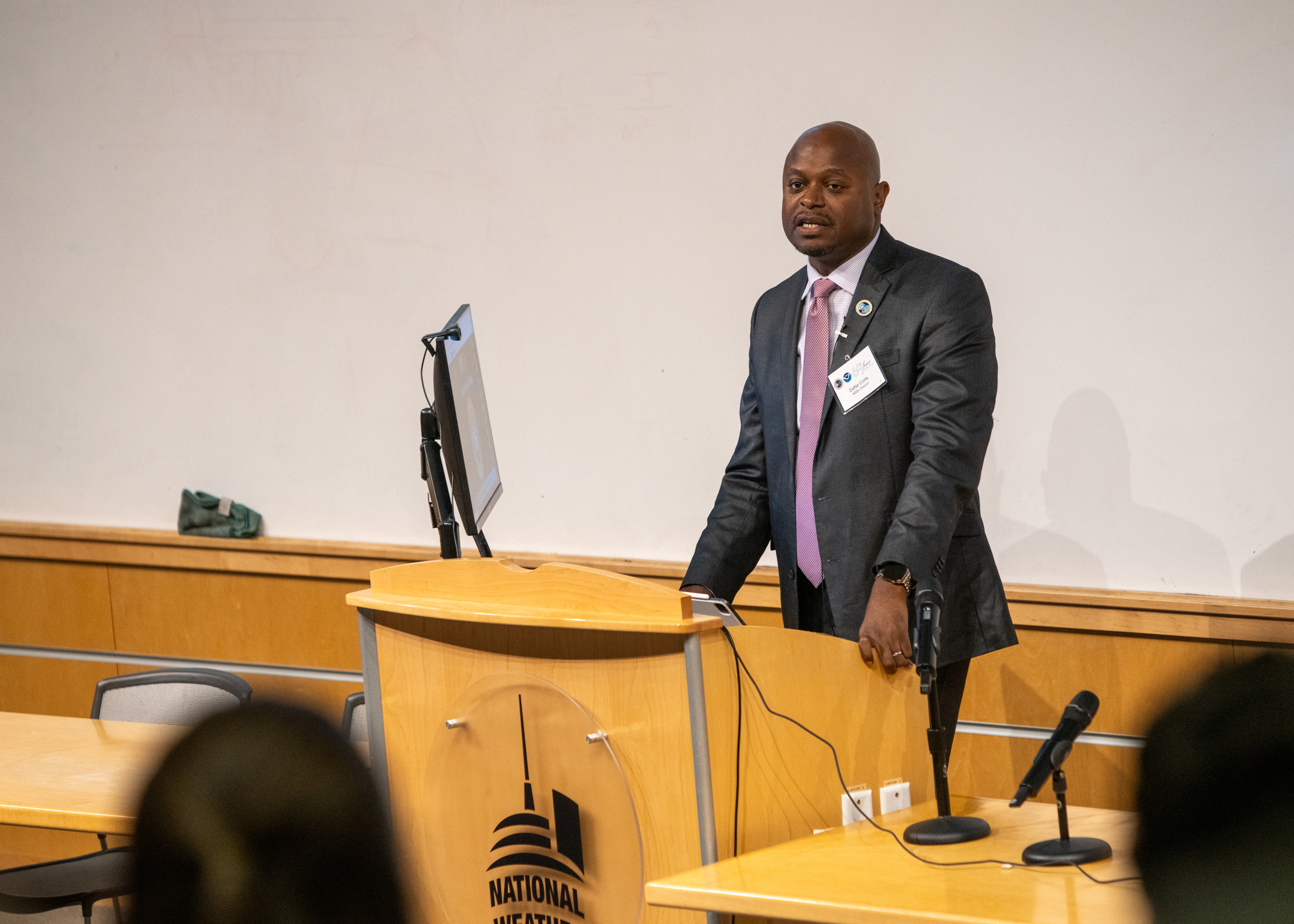
NOAA National Severe Storms Laboratory (NSSL) Director DaNa Carlis speaks at the NSSL 60th Anniversary Celebration.

== Honors and awards ==
Among the honors and awards Carlis has received during his career are the following:

- Department of Commerce Bronze Medal (2022)
- NOAA Research Employee of the Year – Personal & Professional Excellence (2021)
- NOAA EEO/Diversity Individual Award (2018)
- NOAA Research Employee of the Year Award – Leadership (2018)
- NOAA Administrator's Award (2016, 2017)
- Department of Commerce Gold Medal (2015)

== Professional service ==
Carlis is a member of the American Meteorological Society (AMS) and was elected in 2022 to serve a three-year term (from 2023 to 2026) on the AMS Council. He also has served as chair of the AMS Forecast Improvement Group. In 2014, he co-founded NOAA's Diversity and Professional Advancement Working Group (DPAWG) with Michelle Hawkins of NWS. Global ERG Network named DPAWG the fifth-best employee resource group as part of its 2021 Diversity Impact Awards.

He also serves as a member of the University Corporation for Atmospheric Research (UCAR) Community Programs (UCP) External Advisory Committee (EAC), which guides the programs and activities of UCP in its effort to serve researchers, academics, and others in the Earth system science community.

== Personal life ==
Carlis is married to Dr. Lydia Carlis, chief learning and impact officer at Acelero Learning, an early childhood education provider, and founder/CEO of Eyemagination Enterprises, LLC. In 2014, the pair co-authored the book M. I. T.: Meteorologist in Training. They have a daughter, Dia Carlis, a Georgia State University graduate who works as a law clerk in New York City.
