= Edwin Kessler =

American atmospheric scientist

Edwin Kessler III
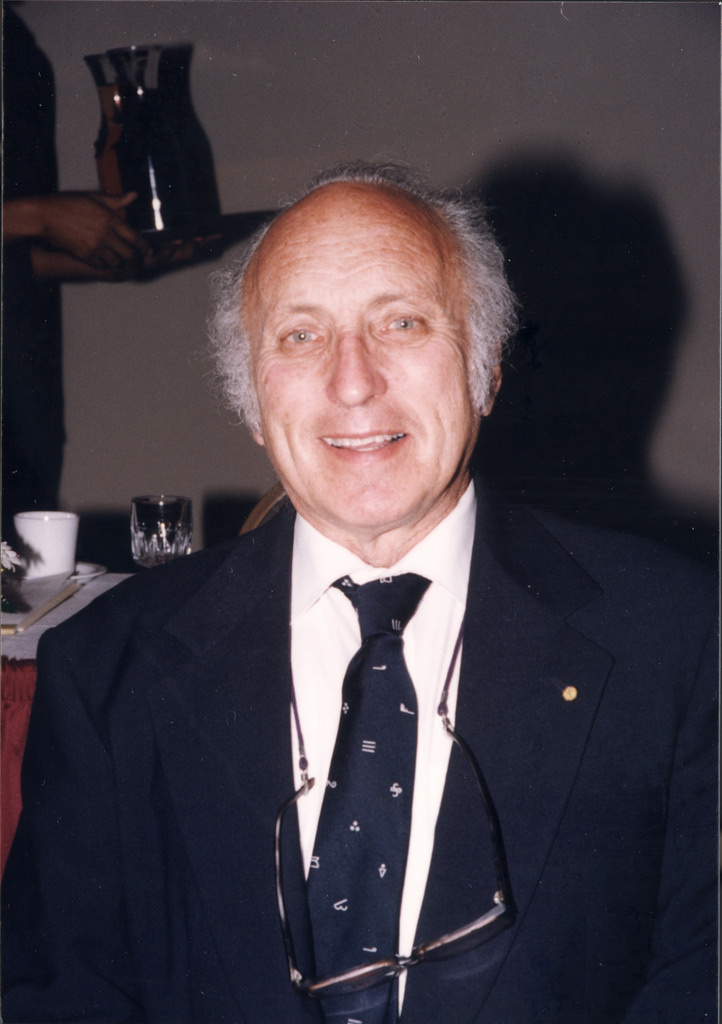
- Born: December 2, 1928; Brooklyn, New York City, New York, US
- Died: February 21, 2017 (aged 88); Cedar Park, Texas, US
- Education: Columbia University (1950); MIT (M.S., 1952; Sc.D., 1957)
- Known for: Overseeing development of Doppler weather radar, Kessler Microphysics Scheme, first director of National Severe Storms Laboratory
- Awards: Cleveland Abbe Award
- Scientific career
- Fields: Meteorology
- Institutions: Cambridge Research Laboratories, Travelers Research Center, NSSL
- Theses: Temperature and pressure changes in the upper troposphere and lower stratosphere (1952); Radar-synoptic analysis of an intense winter storm (1957)
- Doctoral advisor: Henry G. Houghton
- Other academic advisors: J. M. Austin

Edwin Kessler III (December 2, 1928 – February 21, 2017) was an American atmospheric scientist who oversaw the development of Doppler weather radar and was the first director of the National Severe Storms Laboratory (NSSL).

== Early life ==
Kessler was the oldest of three sons, born to Edwin Kessler Jr. and Marie Rosa Weil in Brooklyn on December 2, 1928. After early years in New York City, Marie, Edwin, and the other sons went to live in his mother's home town of Corpus Christi, Texas, while his father was in the military overseas. He graduated from Corpus Christi High School in 1946. He returned to New York to attend Columbia College of Columbia University but left in 1946 for 18 months to enlist in the Army, afterward remaining in the Army Intelligence Reserve and returning to Columbia where he graduated in 1950. Kessler married his high school classmate, Lottie Catherine Menger, on May 28, 1950.

== Career ==
Kessler then transferred to the Air Force and moved to Massachusetts. He earned M.S. and Sc.D. degrees from MIT in 1952 and 1957, respectively, also earning a minor in astronomy from Harvard. He became a captain in the Air Force Reserve where he worked in the Weather Radar Branch and was chief of the Synoptic Meteorology Section at the Cambridge Research Laboratories (AFCRC). Kessler went to Connecticut in 1960 where he worked in the Atmospheric Physics Division at the Travelers Research Center. In 1964 Kessler moved back west to Oklahoma where he was the first director of the National Severe Storms Laboratory (NSSL) in Norman where he contributed as a researcher and as a manager. He was also an affiliate professor at the University of Oklahoma (OU) until his retirement in 1987.

NSSL obtained a surplus Air Force Doppler radar unit in 1969, which became operational in 1971, under the direction of Kessler who considered the technology to be potentially a great advancement over conventional radar. Always believing in the utility of both research and operational meteorology, Kessler approved of storm chasing field intercept programs and the experimental Doppler radar captured the entire life cycle of the Union City, Oklahoma tornado in 1973 which was a hallmark storm due to the successful deployment of researchers in the field around the storm. Studies of the storm led to new conceptual models and the success of the field intercept data collection led to their being an important aspect of severe storms research. NSSL radar research led to the development of NEXRAD. Kessler also developed the Kessler Microphysics Scheme, which continues to be used in atmospheric modeling and numerical weather prediction (NWP). Kessler served on advisory panels for the National Center for Atmospheric Research (NCAR) and for NASA, as well as to organizations in foreign countries including Mexico and Saudi Arabia. Jeff Kimpel, the third director of NSSL, credits Kessler's vision and acumen in bringing together government, academic, and private industry groups to make Norman a major research and forecast center in what came to be known as the Norman weather enterprise.

Kessler authored or coauthored more than 250 peer-reviewed papers, as well as published numerous reports, conference presentations, books, and monographs. Research interests included radar meteorology, aviation weather, precipitation physics, and climatology. In addition to the adjunct professorship at OU he lectured at MIT, Boston University, and McGill University. He was a Councilor and a Fellow of the American Meteorological Society (AMS), a Fellow of the Royal Meteorological Society (RMetS) as well as the American Association for the Advancement of Science (AAAS), a Senior Member of the American Institute of Aeronautics and Astronautics (AIAA), and a member of Sigma Xi and the American Geophysical Union (AGU). He received the AMS Cleveland Abbe Award for "distinguished service through studies on severe storms, microphysical processes and radar meteorology". He also served as a consultant to the private sector, particularly on investigations of aviation accidents and incidents, which he continued doing after retiring.

== Post-retirement ==
Kessler maintained a lifelong interest in politics—local, state, and federal—with particular interests in conservation, the environment, anti-corruption and transparency in government. He advocated wind power and other alternative energy, sustainable transport, and sustainable agriculture, managing 350 acres (140 ha) near Purcell, Oklahoma, which included cattle and an organic farm. In the 1980s he began donating parcels of the farm to OU and it became a focus of activity, particularly by the Departments of Botany and Microbiology. The Kessler Atmospheric and Ecological Field Station (KAEFS) is an environmental stewardship demonstration and research site that also includes prairie restoration and climate, weather, and space weather observations. Observations include a mesonet surface weather station of the Oklahoma Mesonet, wind profilers, and a magnetometer. Upon retirement Kessler became politically outspoken and engaged. He worked with Common Cause, for several years chairing Oklahoma Common Cause. His transparency work included monitoring the actions of legislatures, courts, city and county councils. He joined other scientists, including Chuck Doswell, in opposing the funding scheme proposed to construct what became the National Weather Center (NWC) building, as it diverted funds from a state program to remediate leaking underground oil storage tanks.

Kessler's wife, Lottie, died on May 11, 2011. He died on February 21, 2017, aged 88, with his son, Austin, at his side in Cedar Park, Texas, where he lived. He is survived by another son, Thomas. He was cremated and was interred at the Kessler Atmospheric and Ecological Field Station.

== See also ==
- Donald W. Burgess
- Leslie R. Lemon
- Roger Lhermitte
