= Roger Lhermitte =

French meteorologist pioneer of the Doppler weather radar

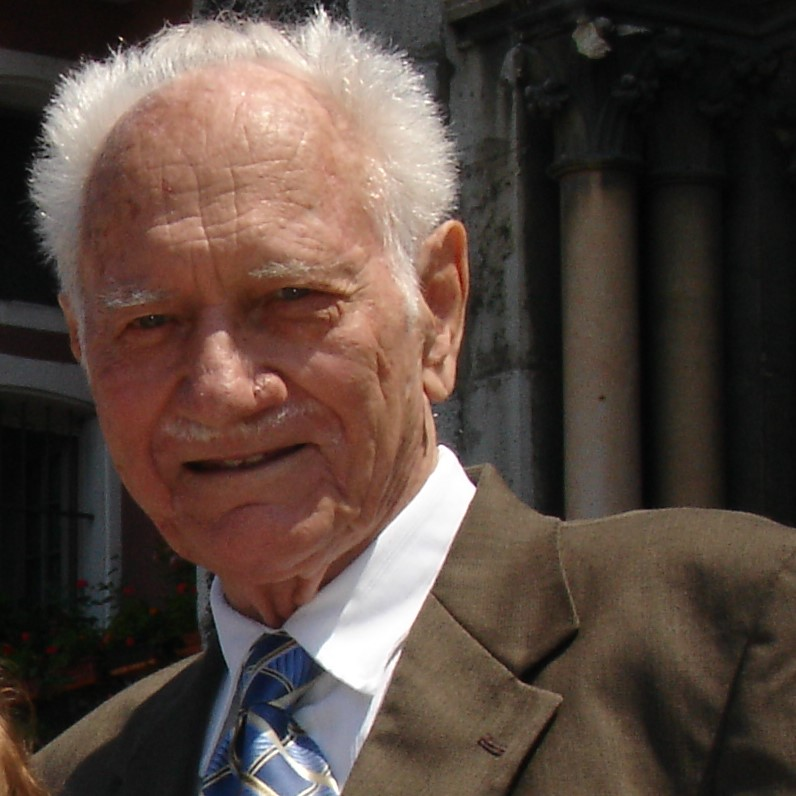
- Lhermitte in June 2007
- Born: May 28, 1920; Ergal, Yvelines, France
- Died: November 21, 2016 (aged 96); Miami, Florida, U.S.
- Known for: Radar meteorology
- Awards: Second Half Century Award, J.C. Stevens Award
- Scientific career
- Fields: Meteorology, Radar, Doppler Radar, Radar Meteorology, Electronics Engineering, Radio Wave Propagation, Signal Processing, Sonar
- Institutions: Siemens, Air Force Research Laboratory, Sperry Rand Research, National Severe Storms Laboratory, Wave Propagation Laboratory and University of Miami
- Thesis: Contribution à L'Étude des Précipitations Par L’analyse des Échos de Pluies Obtenus à L’aide de Radars:.
- Doctoral advisor: Marcel Pauthenier

Roger M. Lhermitte (May 28, 1920 – November 21, 2016) was a French meteorologist who "pioneered the development of meteorological Doppler radar." His career extended from the 1950s until his death where he made numerous contributions to the field of radar meteorology resulting in over 100 publications and numerous patents.

== Early life and education ==
Roger Lhermitte was born in Ergal, a hamlet of Jouars-Pontchartrain in the Yvelines, France, on 28 May 1920. During the occupation of Germany in France in World War II, he was compulsorily enlisted by the Germans to work for Siemens in Berlin. "While in Berlin, he made numerous trips to bomb shelters for safety, an experience he likened many times to Kurt Vonnegut’s descriptions of Dresden in Slaughterhouse Five. Kurt’s brother, Bernard Vonnegut, was later to become one of Roger’s closest colleagues in atmospheric electricity".

After the end of the war, Lhermitte continued his education to pursue his doctoral thesis at the Faculté des Sciences de L’Université de Paris under the guidance of Professor Pauthenier. The subject of his thesis work was titled "Contribution à L'Étude des Précipitations Par L’analyse des Échos de Pluies Obtenus à L’aide de Radars" which, roughly translated to English was "Contributions to the study of Precipitations via the Analysis of Radar Data."

The thesis begins with the sentence "La presence des gouttes de pluie d'une precipitation provoque la diffusion des ondes centrimetriques et par suite l'apparition d'echos sur les indicateurs des radars utilisant ces longueurs d'onde", which roughly translates to "The presence of precipitation provokes the scattering of centimeter wavelength radiation, which is followed by the appearance of echos on radars using this same wavelength." This is the beginning of decades long research in atmospheric science that led to over 100 publications and numerous patents.

== Career ==
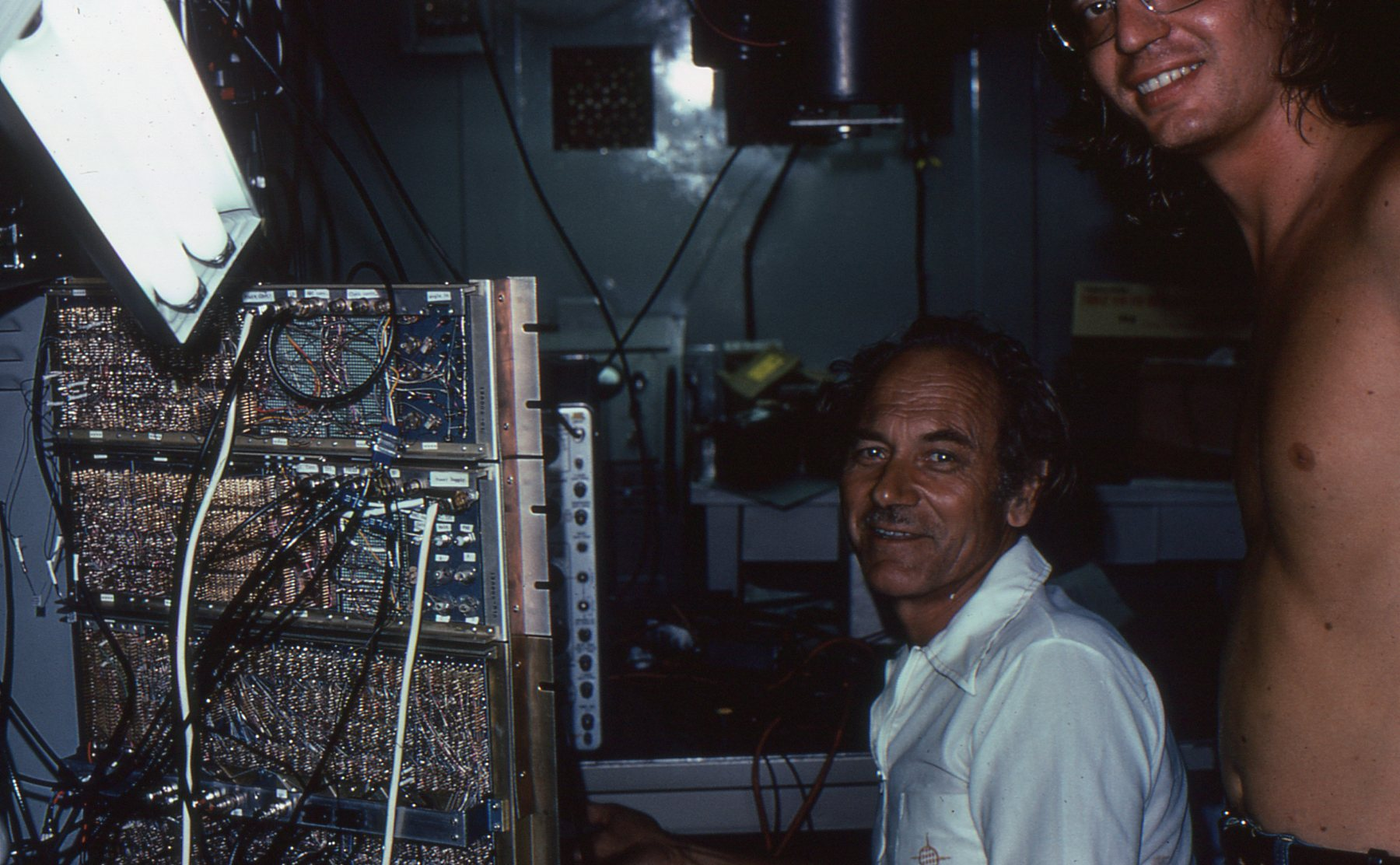
Lhermitte and his radar in Clewiston, Florida

Lhermitte began his career as a scientist at "la Météorologie nationale," first in the city of Trappes, France, and later on Magny-les-Hameaux.

Lhermitte first went to North America as a visitor to the Stormy Weather Group in Montreal, QC. He left Paris on January 2, 1955, arriving the next day. There he met Walter Hitcshfeld, J.S. Marshall, K. Gunn and T.East at McGill University. On that trip he met David Atlas whom he would work with in the future. The next year, he visited the Blue Hill Observatory in Boston, MA, making it his first visit to the United States. There he worked with Atlas, R. Donaldson, Edwin Kessler and others. The "early work there led to the installation of the WSR-57 radar installation network."

After these two visits, went back to France and stayed there a few years.

External image
- Roger Lhermitte (left) and Ralph Donaldson (right) at Blue Hill Observatory in 1956
- https://ibb.co/BZTTKwZ

After a few visits to North America, Lhermitte emigrated to the United States in January 1961 to work with Atlas at the Air Force Cambridge Research Laboratories (AFCRL). He left the AFCRL for the Sperry Rand Research center in New York, NY in 1963. Some of his work included exploring the use of pulsed Doppler radars to extend the capabilities of conventional Doppler radars in allowing for range discrimination.

In 1964 Edwin Kessler had just become director of National Severe Storms Laboratory (NSSL) and was coordinating efforts to build a weather radar program. He had maintained contact with Roger, and reached out to him to join this new program. Lhermitte left the Sperry Rand Research center in early 1964 for this new venture to work with Kessler, K. Wilk, Dale Sirmans and others. By the end of 1964, they had completed a pulsed 3 cm radar.

In early 1967, Lhermitte left the NSSL for the Wave Propagation Laboratory (WPL) in Boulder, CO, at the request of G. Benton who was the director of ERL. He was to work with G. Little on the formation of the Wave Propagation Laboratory (WPL). In 1970, he took a position as a professor at the Rosenstiel School of Marine, Atmospheric, and Earth Science at the University of Miami. During his time at the University of Miami, he was the first to develop the 94-GHz doppler radar for the measurement of clouds. The weather radar was built in 1987. Its design and implementation is described in Lhermitte's 1987 paper "A 94-GHz Doppler Radar for Cloud Observations". The observation by Lhermitte of Mie oscillations in the 94 GHz spectrum paved the way to the measurement of drop size distributions in precipitating clouds. This was later explored by Pavlos Kollias et al. in a paper entitled "Why Mie?":

The technique that we highlight in this paper represents yet another example of the visionary contributions that Dr. Roger Lhermitte has made to radar meteorogology.

— Pavlos Kollias, Why Mie?: Accurate Observations of Vertical Air Velocities and Raindrops Using a Cloud Radar,

== Retirement ==
Lhermitte retired as professor emeritus in the early nineties. Near the end of his career, he decided to write a book on his experiences with centimeter and millimeter wavelength radars in meteorology. It was not written to be a comprehensive review of radars in meteorology, but rather his perspective on it. It contains many original ideas developed by him.

Lhermitte died on November 21, 2016, in Miami, Florida.

== Contributions to the field of radar meteorology ==
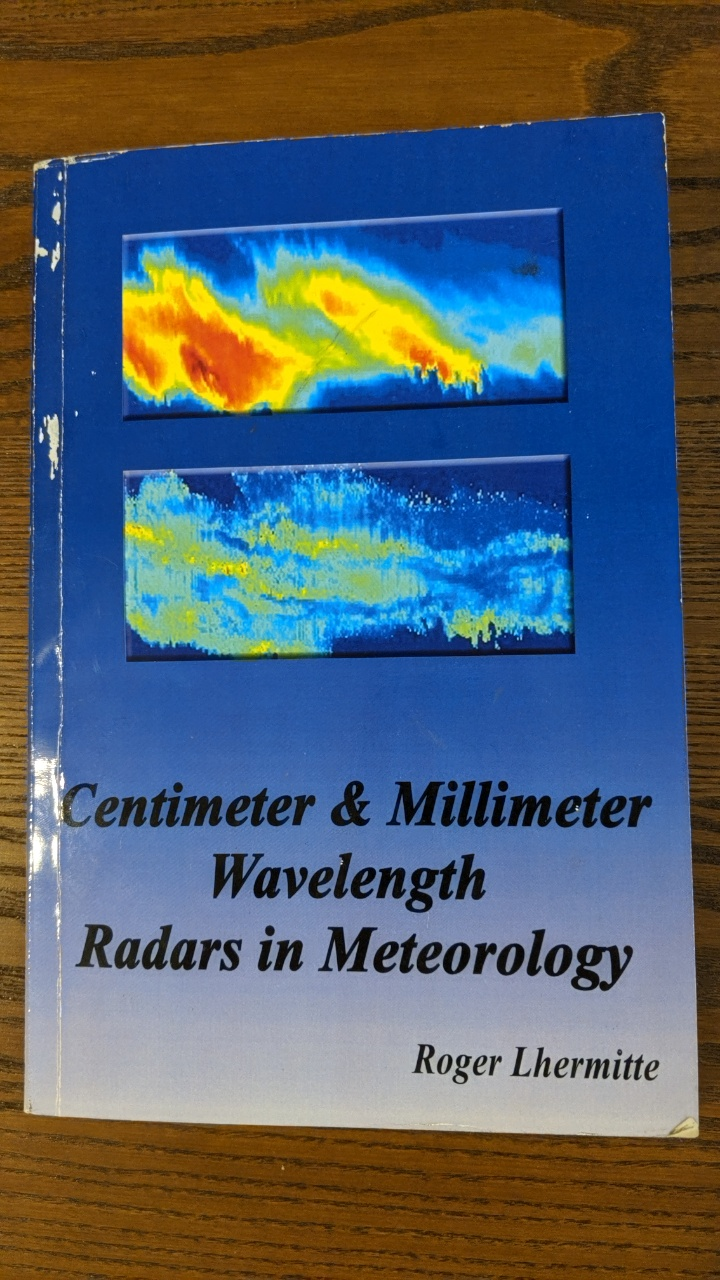
Front

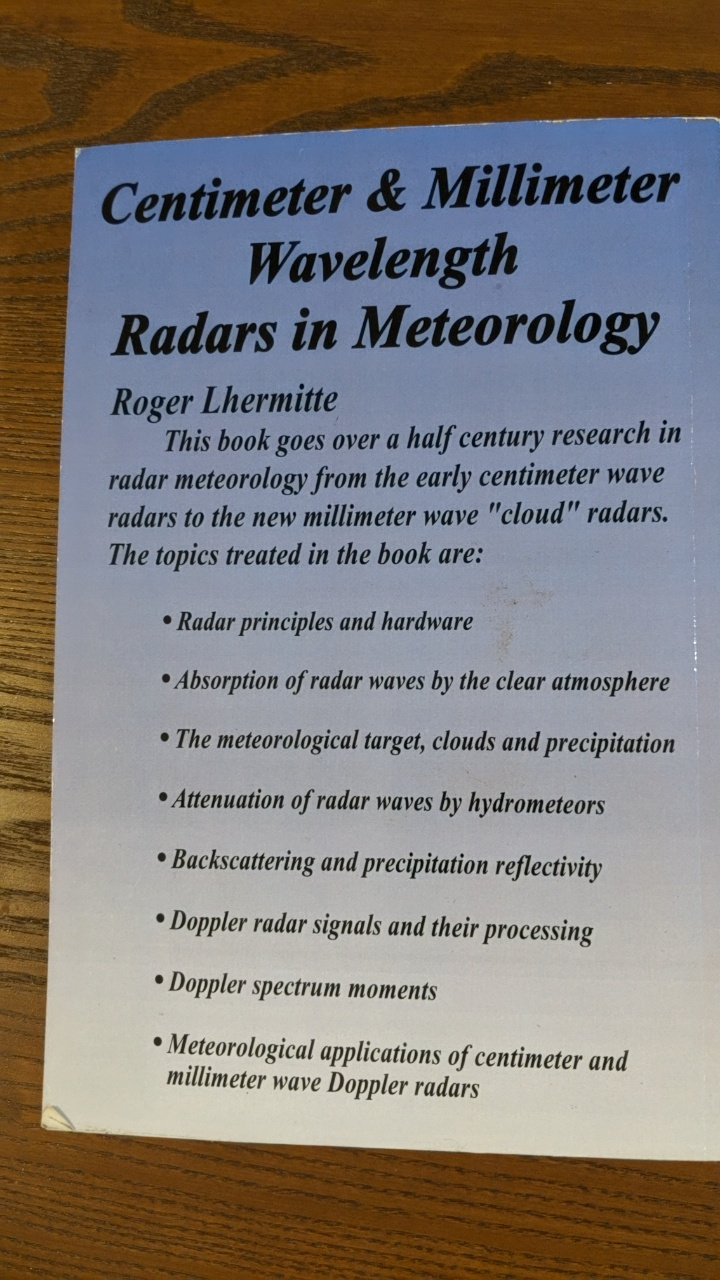
Back of the book

Cover of Lhermitte's book on Centimeter and Millimeter Wavelength Radars in Meteorology

From an article on the 30th Conference on Radar Meteorology, Roger Lhermitte's contributions as listed

* pioneered the development of weather radar;

- designed and built the first pulse-pair processor that revolutionized Doppler weather radar research;
- shared his pulse-pair processor design with NCAR, which made the technology available for the broad community to use;
- developed unique pulsed Doppler sonar for ocean current measurements;
- pioneered the development and demonstrated these of 3-mm radar for cloud studies (such radar will now be deployed from satellite); and
- pioneered multiple-Doppler radar measurements of three-dimensional kinematic fields.

— Steiner, Matthias & Meischner, Peter., The 30th international conference on radar meteorology,

=== 30th Conference on Radar Meteorology (A Tribute to Roger Lhermitte) ===
The 30th Conference on Radar Meteorology was held in tribute for Lhermitte, who was 82 at the time. An article in BAMS (2002) describes the tribute:

Besides the traditional banquet (see p. 1567 in the Nowcast section of this issue for the banquet speech of Rit Carbone), the conference featured a special evening event honoring Roger Lhermitte for his pioneering work in radar meteorology.

— Steiner, Matthias & Meischner, Peter., The 30th international conference on radar meteorology,

== Publications ==
=== Patents ===
- Atmospheric motion non-coherent pulse doppler system (July 6, 1965)
- Method and means of determining variability of atmospheric motion with respect to altitude (July 27, 1965)
- Atmospheric Motion Coherent Pulse Doppler Radar System (October 12, 1965)
- Radar tornado alarm (September 6, 1966)
- Waveform Averaging and Contouring Device For Weather Radars And The Like (January 30, 1968)

=== Selected publications ===
- Lhermitte, Roger (2002). Centimeter & millimeter wavelength radars in meteorology. Lhermitte Publications. ISBN 0971937206.
- Lhermitte, R. (1959), La representation directe du spectre de fluctuation des echos radars donnes par des precipitations, 248, 1554-1556
- Lhermitte, R. (1958), Sur la fluctuation des echos de precipitations, C. R. Acad. Sci., 246, 1245-1248
- Lhermitte, R. (1957), Sur une method d'observation d'intensite des echos de pluie, C. R. Acad. Sci., 244, 2955-2957
- Lhermitte, R. (1952), Les "bandes superieurs" dans la structure verticale des echos de pluie, C. R. Acad. Sci., 235, 1414-1416
- Lhermitte, R. (1964) "Doppler radars as severe storm sensors." Bulletin of the American Meteorological Society 45.9 (1964): 587-596
- Lhermitte, R. (1970) "Dual-Doppler radar observation of convective storm circulation." Preprints 14th Conf. Radar Meteor. Tucson, Amer. Meteor. Sco., 139-144
- Lhermitte, R., and R. Serafin (1984) "Pulse-to-pulse coherent Doppler sonar signal processing techniques," J. Atmos. and Ocean. Technol., vol. 1, pp 293–308
- Lhermitte, R. (1987) "A 94 GHz Doppler Radar for Cloud Observations." J. Atmos. Ocean . Tech., 4 (1), 36‐48
- Lhermitte, R. (1990) "Attenuation and Scattering of Millimeter Wavelength Radiation by Clouds and Precipitation." J. Atmos. Ocean Tech., 7, 464‐479
