= NSSL =

NSSL may refer to:

- National Security Space Launch, US government procurement contract regime for orbital space launches
- National Severe Storms Laboratory, one of seven regional laboratories of the US National Oceanic and Atmospheric Administration
