= Advanced Technology Demonstrator =

Experimental weather radar in Oklahoma, US

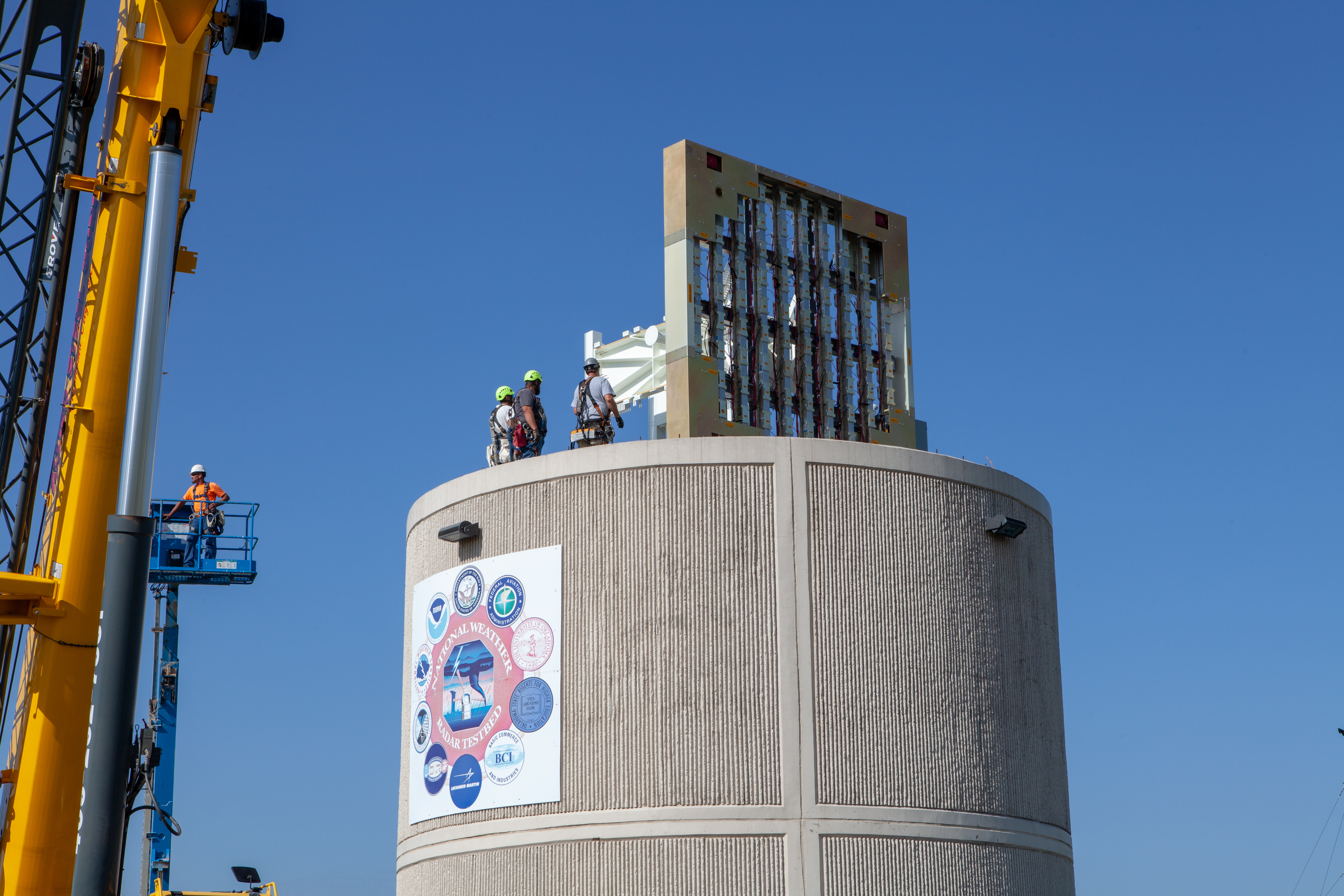
- ATD Installation, 2018
- Country of origin: US
- Introduced: 2018
- No. built: 1
- Type: Weather radar
- Frequency: 2.7 GHz (S-Band)
- Beamwidth: Nominal 1.3°
- Pulsewidth: Adjustable; Pulse Compressed
- RPM: Variable – mechanically and electronically steered
- Diameter: 4.3 m (14 ft)
- Azimuth: 360°

Advanced Technology Demonstrator (ATD) is an individual experimental weather radar in Norman, Oklahoma, using s-band phased array technology seeking to enhance phased array capabilities with the addition of dual-polarity and pulse compression. Its predecessor, MPAR, was the first large-scale PAR experiment taken on by NOAA in 2003, and was deployed until its eventual decommission in favor of ATD in 2016.

Future radar networks – such as the successor to NEXRAD, and possibly across multiple disciplines external to meteorology, such as air traffic control – are planned to utilize PAR technology due to its superior temporal volumetric capabilities.

== History ==
By and large, meteorological monitoring is done operationally by relatively legacy weather radar systems – in the United States, the NEXRAD network has been the primary weather radar network since the early 1990s. For the first 20 years of operations, its data output was, in comparison to modern schemes, considerably more modest. All systems were single-polarity and doppler capable, but were comparatively limited in their resolution until the advent of super-resolution in 2008 (which effectively quadrupled spatial resolution, and doubled azimuthal resolution).

Perhaps the most important hardware upgrade to the NEXRAD system came with the introduction of dual-polarization capabilities in 2011. This upgrade allowed all systems to decipher microphysical properties not previously visible to a single beam polarity. This ability allows distinction between hydrometeor types, can be used to extrapolate rain rates, and is often utilized to detect debris during tornadic events.

Combined with the introduction of faster scanning strategies, such as MESO-SAILS, NEXRAD was proven to be an extremely valuable and highly necessary tool for severe weather monitoring and asset protection across the United States.

The primary disadvantage to these more legacy systems, however, is the timeliness – even with the advent of advanced scanning strategies, typical volume times still take on the order or 5–7 minutes to complete. Aforementioned rapid-scan strategies bring low-level data times down to 2–3 minutes, but sacrifice full-volume timeliness instead. To combat the issue of limited temporal resolution, NOAA and NSSL began research into the viability of PAR technology beginning with MPAR in 2003, and lasting until 2016.

== Deployment ==
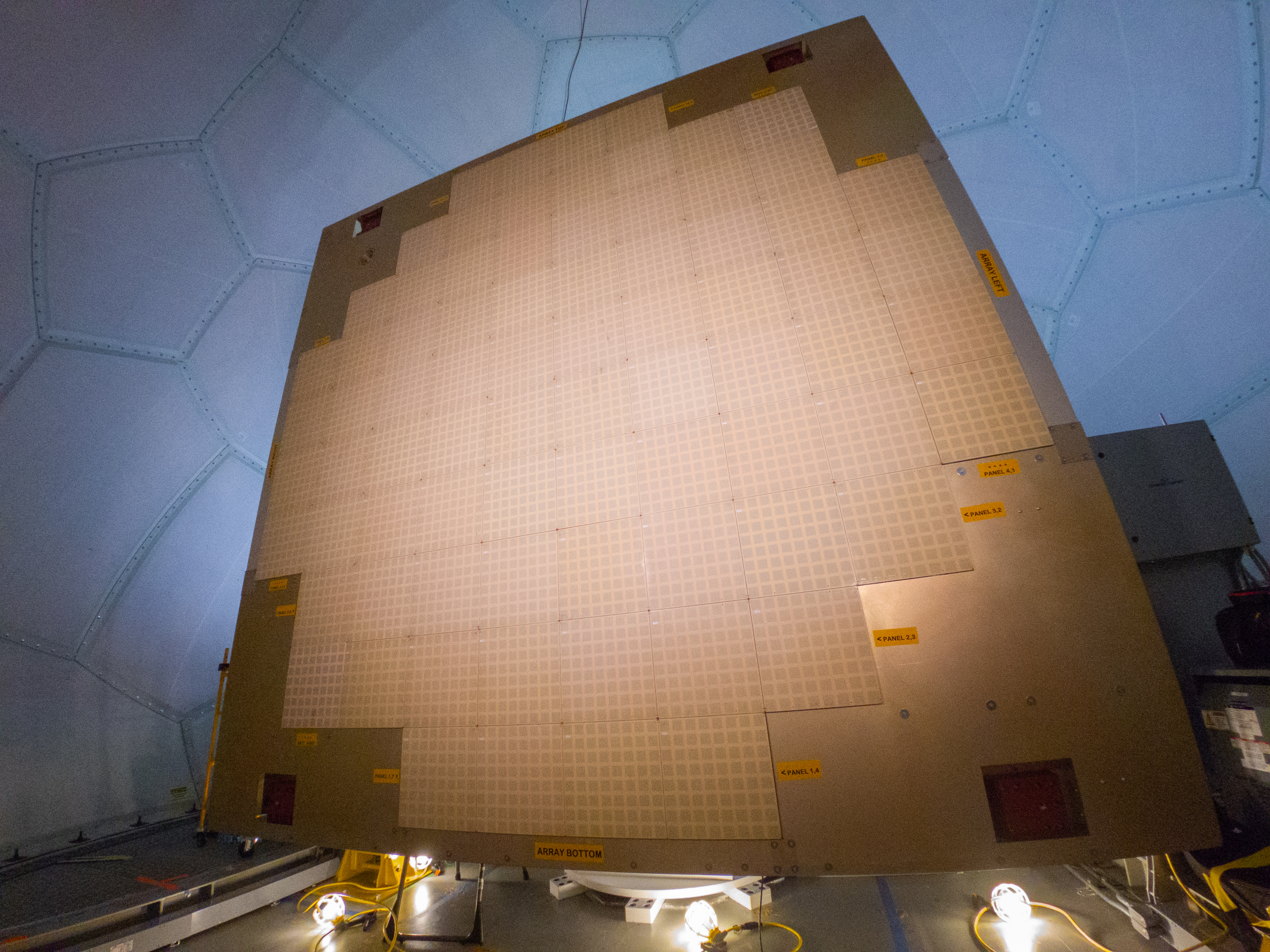
The Advanced Technology Demonstrator flat panel antenna.

Following the decommissioning of its predecessor, ATD was installed at National Severe Storms Laboratory in Norman, Oklahoma on 12 July 2018. MIT Lincoln Laboratory was the head design group for ATD. Like MPAR and NEXRAD, the ATD radar operates in the S-band, itself utilizing a flat panel phased array with a 90° field of view. The overall panel is actually composed of 76 square panels, each with 64 radiating elements (in total some 4,864 elements) arranged on a 14-foot (4.3 m) antenna.

ATD seeks to improve upon the work originally done by MPAR – for example, MPAR laid the groundwork for rapid-volumetric scanning abilities, but was dramatically limited in its operational prospects by the difficulty of integrating orthogonal waveforms into schemes involving electronic beam steering. This problem with dual-polarity persists, but is among the foundational research directives of ATD, being among the first large-scale, dual-polarimetric PAR systems internationally. As of 2023, research is ongoing as to the viability of future radar networks utilizing technology similar to ATD.

== See also ==
- Rapid Refresh (weather prediction)
