= Multifunction Phased Array Radar =

2003 US experimental Doppler radar system

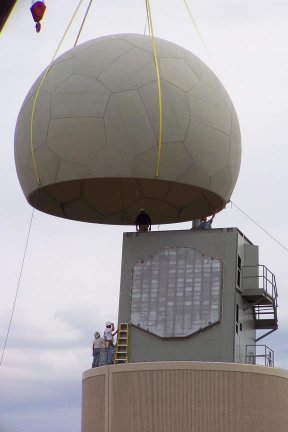
- MPAR being installed in 2003.
- Country of origin: USA
- Introduced: 2003
- No. built: 1
- Type: Weather/Air-traffic radar
- Frequency: 3,200 MHz (S band)
- PRF: 918 Hz
- Beamwidth: broadside 1.6° - 2.2° at 45°
- Pulsewidth: Adjustable to 2.5 μs
- RPM: Mechanically steered
- Altitude: 360 m (1,180 ft)
- Diameter: 3.7 m (12 ft)
- Azimuth: Mechanically steered - 4+ antennas anticipated with operational deployment
- Elevation: up to 60º
- Power: 750 kW

Multifunction Phased Array Radar (MPAR) was an experimental Doppler radar system that utilized phased array technology. MPAR could scan at angles as high as 60 degrees in elevation, and simultaneously track meteorological phenomena, biological flyers, non-cooperative aircraft, and air traffic. From 2003 through 2016, there was one operational MPAR within the mainland United States—a repurposed AN/SPY-1A radar set loaned to NOAA by the U.S. Navy. The MPAR was decommissioned and removed in 2016.

NOAA and the FAA plan to eventually decommission their NEXRAD, TDWR and ASR radars in favor of several hundred phased array radars conceptually similar to MPAR.

== History ==
The MPAR was derived from a U.S. Navy shipborne radar, the AN/SPY-1. First seeing service beginning in 1973 when it was installed on the USS Norton Sound, the AN/SPY-1 became the standard air search radar of the U.S. Navy and the navies of several other allied nations. During use, it was discovered that the false-alarm rate was high due to the radar detecting swarms of insects and clutter from nearby mountainous terrain. Although problematic for a military air defence radar, this is ideal for a weather radar, and made phased array radars a prime candidate for implementation in the meteorological spectrum. As different versions of the AN/SPY family arose through the 1990s, in 2003 the U.S. Navy loaned a surplus AN/SPY-1A radar to NOAA for meteorological research. NOAA built a tower and pedestal to house the antenna and its components at the National Severe Storms Laboratory in Norman, Oklahoma.

== Deployment ==
May 31, 2013 Oklahoma Phased Array Radar Reflectivity

Conventional radars typically use a large, parabolic dish to focus the radar beam, and rely on motors to move the dish in azimuth and elevation. By contrast, phased arrays are an antenna array, composed of many small antennas on a flat panel, which steer the radar beam electronically by changing the phase of the signal emitted from each antenna element. The signals from each element add together in the desired direction, and cancel out in other directions, a phenomenon known as interference. This capability can obviate the need for motors and moving parts, which increases the reliability and can decrease the cost of the system. However, the angles in which a flat panel phased array can steer its beam is limited to a maximum of approximately 120°, with 90° being more realistic. This means that four panels, mounted at right angles to each other, are required to provide full 360° coverage—or, fewer panels (even just one), mounted on a rotating pedestal as with a conventional dish radar. An alternative is to construct the radar out of many tall but narrow antenna strips arranged in a cylinder.

From 2003 to 2016, the MPAR formed the core of the National Weather Radar Testbed (NWRT), used as a proof-of-concept test to validate the meteorological potential of phased array radars. The MPAR provided much faster volume scans, comprehensive wind profiling, and more complete insights to supercellular structure, while simultaneously tracking aircraft. Due to the temporal resolution ranging from 30 to 60 seconds and the one-sector scanning solution used by MPAR, severe storm and tornado warning lead times increased as much as 8 minutes from the already existing 13 minutes.

One drawback of the MPAR, when compared to the currently-deployed NEXRAD radars, was that MPAR did not support dual-polarization—that is, the polar orientation of the radar beam. Dual-polarization technology exploits the fact that falling rain droplets have a flattened shape as a result of air resistance, and thus return a different signal in the horizontal plane than in the vertical. Similarly, other objects—snow, hail, birds and insects, smoke—also reflect the radar beam differently in the two planes. These differences are measured by the radar, computer algorithms process the data, and produce conclusions about the nature of the detected precipitation. Polarimetric radar provides improvements in tornado detection, rainfall rate measurements, precipitation type discrimination, and more. Dual-polarization capability was rolled out to the existing NEXRAD radars beginning in 2011, and was complete by April 2013. MPAR, being a 1970s design, did not have polarimetric capability and retrofitting it would have been costly, if not impossible. This limitation was addressed in the MPAR successor (see section below).

== Non-meteorological applications ==
Besides meteorological observation, MPAR was capable of air traffic surveillance — this was the original role of the powerful AN/SPY-1 radars from which MPAR was derived. The capability to detect and track aircraft while simultaneously monitoring the weather attracted the attention of the FAA, which operates numerous radars for air traffic control purposes (e.g., ASR series), as well as localized weather radars near airports (TDWR units) to detect dangers to aircraft such as flocks of birds, wind shear, and microbursts, amongst others. Nine different dish-based radar models could be replaced by one phased array radar. Consolidating these different types of radars and their functions into one model would lead to cost savings by the reduction of up to one third of radars needed, streamlined training and maintenance, and an increase in reliability through commonality of spare parts.

== Retirement and successor ==
Although MPAR was a powerful radar with unique features unavailable to conventional meteorological and air-surveillance radars, it was an old design, using old parts, and its hardware upgrade potential was severely limited; in many respects it was inferior to conventional radars. To make way for a more advanced radar, MPAR was decommissioned and removed from its tower structure on 26 August 2016.

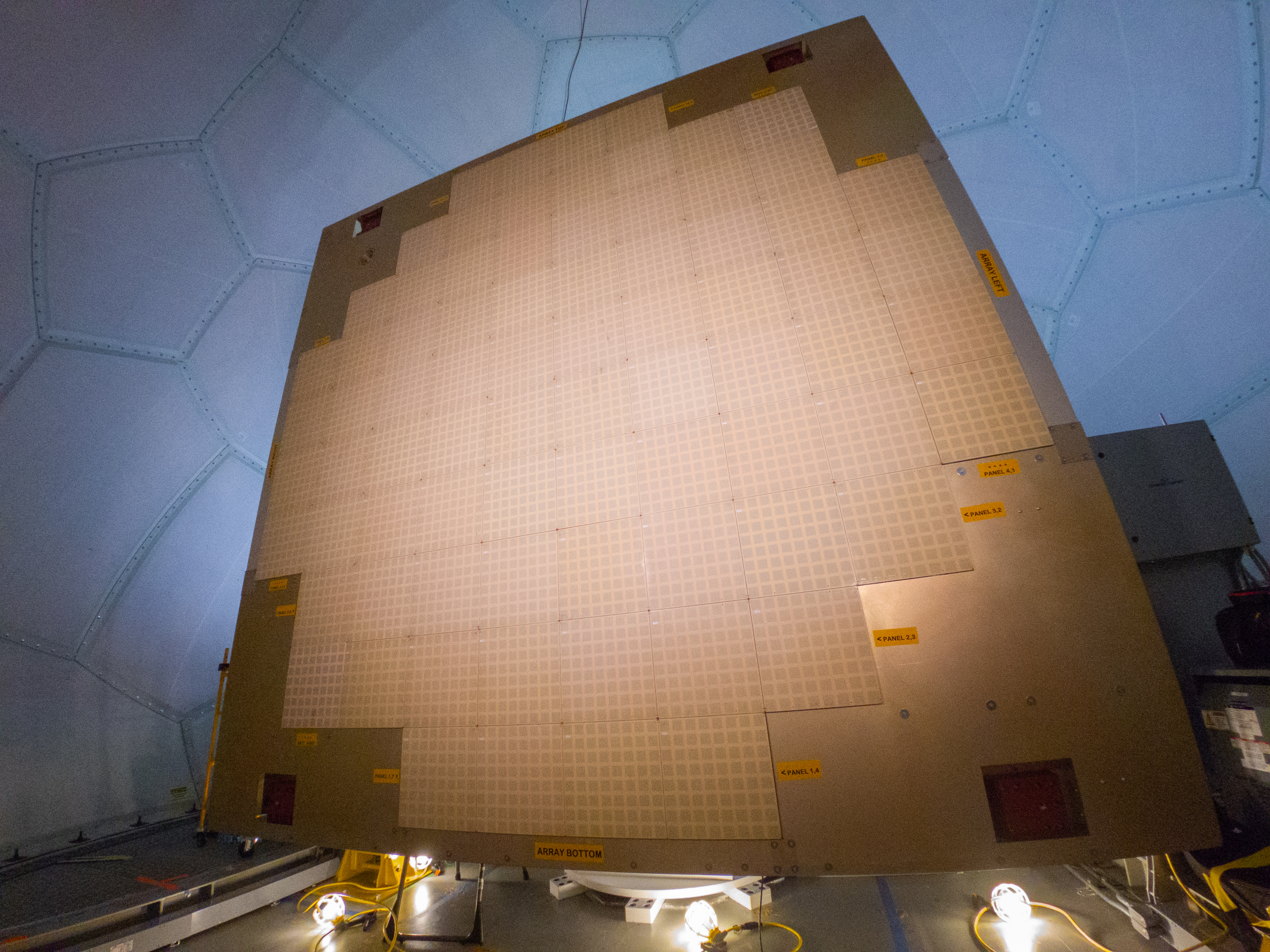
The Advanced Technology Demonstrator flat panel antenna

MIT Lincoln Laboratory headed the project to design a dual-polarity MPAR successor, incorporating the many lessons learned from the development and operation of MPAR. The prototype, called the Advanced Technology Demonstrator (ATD), was installed on 12 July 2018 on the tower formerly housing the MPAR, and it is expected to become fully operational in 2019. Like MPAR, the ATD radar is an S band flat panel phased array with a 90° field of view. It is composed of 76 square panels, each with 64 radiating elements (for a total of 4,864 elements) arranged on a 14 foot (4.3 m) antenna, and is mounted on a rotating pedestal similar to those used by NEXRAD dish antennas.
