= 1973 Union City tornado =

1973 tornado in Oklahoma, U.S.

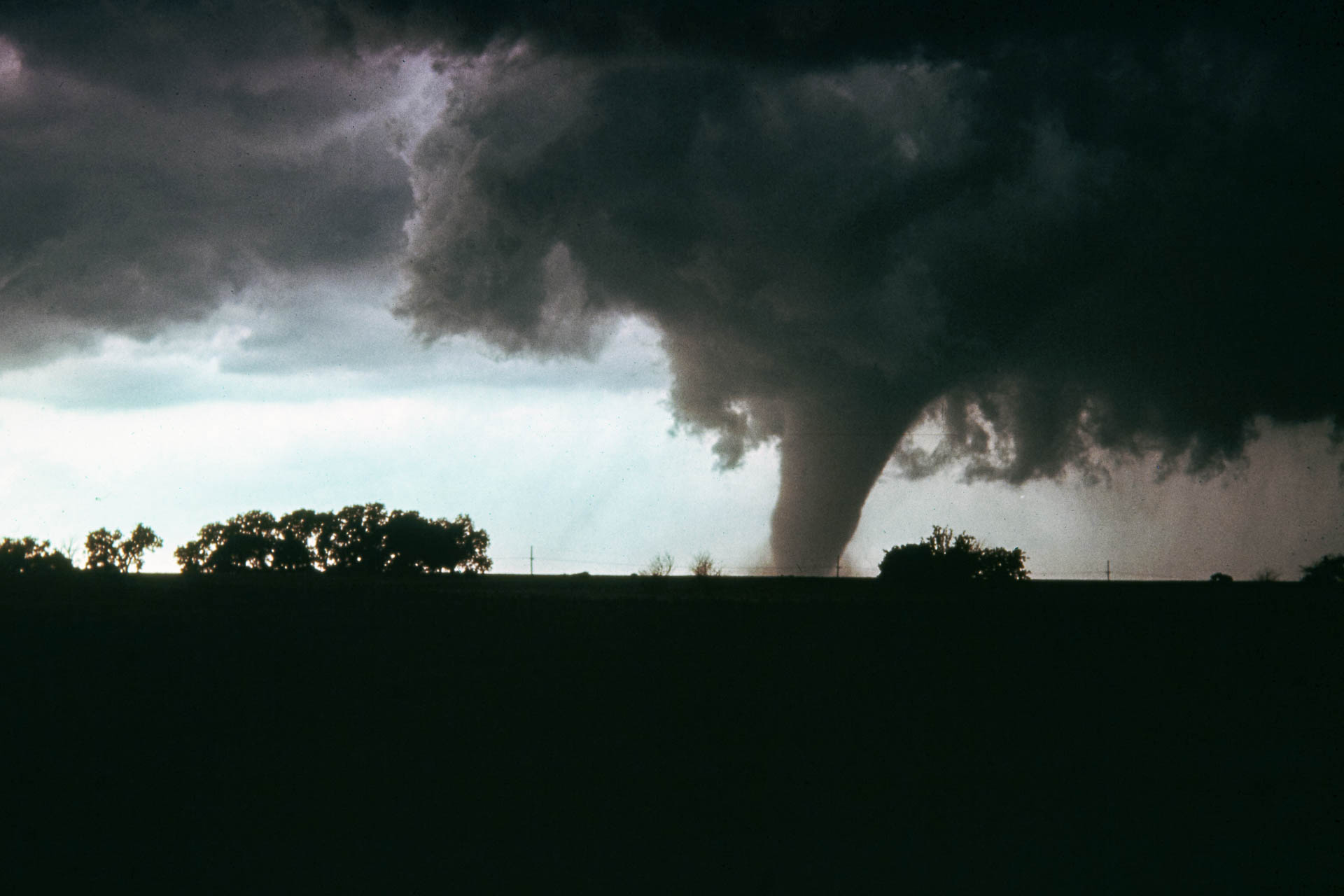
- The tornado, photographed by a National Severe Storms Laboratory research team

Meteorological history
- Formed: May 24, 1973, 3:38 p.m. CDT (UTC–06:00)
- Dissipated: May 24, 1973, 4:04 p.m. CDT (UTC–06:00)
- Duration: 26 minutes

F4 tornado (Note: Per the National Weather Service; Grazulis 1990)

F5 tornado (Note: Per Golden & Purcell 1978, Davies-Jones et al. 1978, Moller et al. 1974)
- Highest gusts: Per photogrammetric analysis: 134 to 179 miles per hour (216 to 288 km/h)

Overall effects
- Fatalities: 2
- Injuries: 4
- Damage: $7.25 million
- Areas affected: Canadian County, Oklahoma, specifically Union City, Oklahoma.
- Part of the Tornadoes of 1973

On May 24, 1973, a large and well-documented tornado moved across Canadian County, Oklahoma, striking the town of Union City. The tornado, which was on the ground for 26 minutes, killed two people and injured four others along a 10.6-mile (17 km) path. Damages from the tornado totaled an estimated $1 million (1973 USD). Numerous structures in Union City were severely damaged or destroyed by the tornado, including multiple grain elevators, farmsteads and mobile homes.

The tornado marked the first time that researchers were able to directly intercept a tornado, which provided crucial data that had been unknown up to that point, including the discovery of the tornado vortex signature. Additionally, it was one of the most well-studied tornadoes in history, with multiple National Severe Storms Laboratory (NSSL) research teams observing and documenting the tornado.

== Tornado summary ==
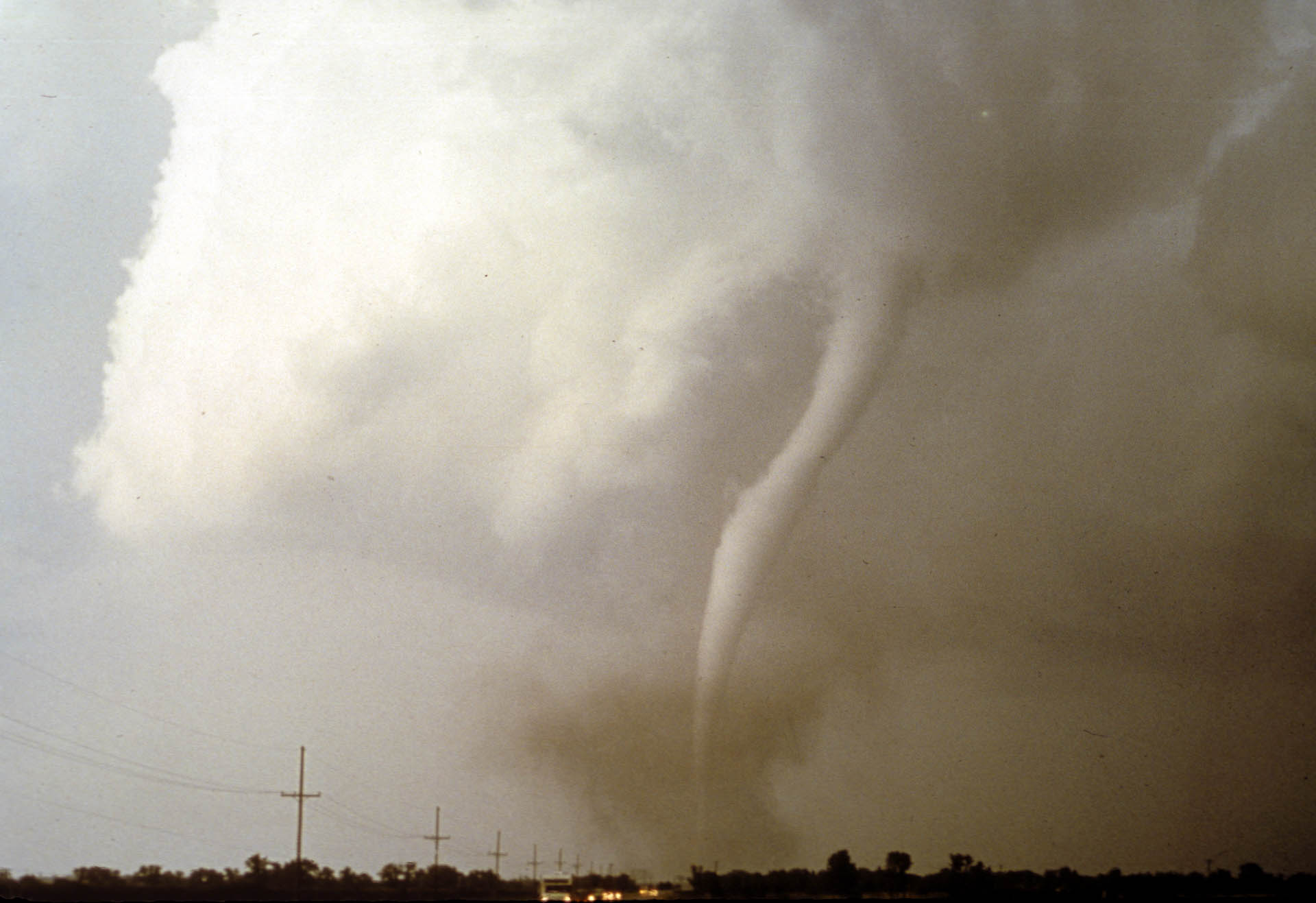
A photo of the tornado nearing the end of its life after tracking through Union City.

At 3:38 pm CST, NSSL researchers noted a funnel cloud that aligned the first indications of tornadic damage, marking the beginning of the tornado's life cycle. The tornado was an estimated 574 feet (175 m) at the time it first touched down, with the physical funnel not completely condensing to the ground. For the first ten minutes of the tornado's life cycle, its condensation funnel only briefly touched the ground two separate times, both lasting less than 15 seconds. During this time, multiple farmsteads were impacted, with maximum damage of F2 on the Fujita scale being observed. At 2:48 pm the condensation funnel firmly planted, and remained visible for the duration of the tornado's life. At the same time tree damage indicated that the tornado was continuously widening.

=== Impact at the Sanders Home and Union City ===
To the east, a home owned by the Sanders family was swept completely off its foundation and reportedly lofted into the air, with standing trees nearby being denuded and a car being stripped down to its frame. Debris from the property was scattered and the engine of a car that had been located on the property was found 984 feet (300 m) to the west. Multiple cattle nearby were killed, with one being impaled in the hips by a wooden board.

The tornado entered Union City at 3:56, with the funnel tilting northeast. While in town, it turned southeast while accelerating to a forward speed of 20–25 miles per hour (32–40 km/h). Through town the tornado shrunk from 951 feet (290 m) to 196 feet (60 m) so dramatically while in town that residents who took shelter as it approached stated that they had seen two different tornadoes, and that the one that they first sheltered from was not the same tornado that they had seen leave the town.

Vehicle mangled and wrapped around a tree near Union City

Damage in Union City was severe, with car-sized debris being thrown hundreds of feet and multiple homes destroyed. The three-story Union City grain elevator was destroyed by the tornado, and another grain elevator was tipped over in the wind, falling onto a tank carrying ammonia and causing a leak that had to be fixed by police officers wearing hazmat gear. Four mobile homes at a mobile home park were damaged. At a gas station, the tornado picked up a 3,000-pound (1,400 kg) gasoline tank; it was never located. In total, 50 homes were destroyed and 24 mobile homes sustained heavy damage. Maximum damage in the town was "between F4 and F5". According to meteorologist Rodger Brown, most people in the area were aware of the tornado as it approached town.

Southeast of Union City, a large frame home was swept off its foundation, with debris being absent. The tornado dissipated at 4:04 pm; it was on the ground for 26 minutes along a 10.6-mile (17 km) path. In total, two people were killed and at least four others were injured. Multiple victims were taken to the Parkview Hospital in El Reno and the Baptist Medical Center, with all having injuries. Damages totaled an estimated $1 million (1973 USD) in Union City alone.

== Meteorological analyses and significance ==
NSSL researchers observing the tornado

The tornado was scanned using an experimental Norman Doppler weather radar, the first time in history a tornado had been observed using such a device. Initial observations using the device began 23 minutes before the tornado itself had touched down, and continued until the storm dissipated. Additionally, the tornado's entire life cycle was captured on film. Upon processing data that had been collected, National Severe Storms Laboratory (NSSL) researchers discovered a pattern indication rotation in the storm; this pattern would later be defined as a tornado vortex signature. Since its discovery during the Union City event, this signature has helped implement lead times during tornadoes and prevent human mortality. Data collected during the tornado was presented at an American Geophysical Union meeting in February 1975. Researchers who aided in scientific documentation and measurement of the tornado included Rodger Brown, Leslie Lemon and Donald W. Burgess.

Additionally, aerial surveys conducted by NSSL researchers found that tornadic width and damage severity do not coorelate, with damage from the Union City tornado at its largest being similar to damage that was done while it was thinner. Photogrammetric analysis of footage that was taken of the tornado using debris inside of the funnel derived maximum wind speeds of 140 to 185 miles per hour (225 to 298 km/h) within the tornado's debris cloud. A secondary photogrammetric analysis by researchers Joseph Golden and Daniel Purcell found maximum winds of 134 to 179 miles per hour (216 to 288 km/h).

Demand for storm cellars rose following the tornado, with one construction firm in Arkansas noting that 100 inquiries were made into shelters directly following the tornado as opposed to one inquiry multiple months prior.

The Royal Meteorological Society noted in 2018 that the tornado was "a turning point in understanding tornado and supercell morphology", while the National Oceanic and Atmospheric Administration described it as "a significant event in the history of severe weather research and forecasting" the following year.

== Other tornadoes ==
One other tornado was documented in Oklahoma on May 24:

F#	Location	County	State	Start Coord.	Time (CST)	Path length	Max width	Summary
F0	Near Lawton	Comanche	OK	26.5285°N 81.894°W	16:00	0.4 mi (0.64 km)	33 yd (30 m)	A small and weak tornado briefly touched down and moved to the northeast, where it did light damage to a freight company.

== See also ==
- History of tornado research
- Tornadoes in Oklahoma
- List of F4, EF4, and IF4 tornadoes
- List of F5, EF5, and IF5 tornadoes
