= David Atlas =

American meteorologist and radar pioneer

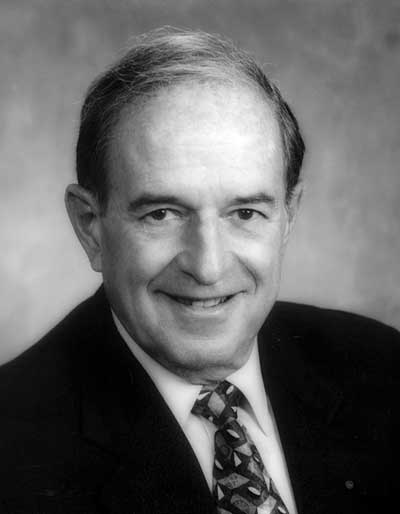
- Born: May 25, 1924; Brooklyn, New York, U.S.
- Died: November 10, 2015 (aged 91); Silver Spring, Maryland, U.S.
- Known for: Radar meteorology
- Awards: Numerous, including Symons Memorial of the RMS in 1989 and Carl-Gustaf Rossby Research Medal in 1996 from the AMS
- Scientific career
- Fields: Meteorology
- Institutions: U.S. Air Force, University of Chicago, National Center for Atmospheric Research and NASA

David Atlas (May 25, 1924 – November 10, 2015) was an American meteorologist and one of the pioneers of radar meteorology. His career extended from World War II to his death: he worked for the US Air Force, then was professor at the University of Chicago and National Center for Atmospheric Research (NCAR), researcher at NASA and private consultant. Atlas owned 22 patents, published more than 260 papers, was a member of many associations, and received numerous honors in his field.

== Early life ==
Atlas was born May 25, 1924, in Brooklyn, New York, to parents who immigrated from Poland and Russia. He studied primary and high school in Brooklyn, starting college in City College of New York afterward. He served in the U.S. Army during the Second World War in the US Army Air Corps, where he worked on the development of radars, in particular on the problem of precipitation echos.

After the war, Atlas remained in the U.S. Air Force for 18 years, working at the Cambridge Research Laboratories, in Bedford, Massachusetts, as head of a research team on weather radars while working on his Master and Doctorate degrees. He particularly investigated the Doppler Effect for use in wind measurement.

== Career ==
From 1966 to 1972, Atlas was professor of meteorology at the University of Chicago. From 1972 to 1976, he was the director of the atmospheric technologies division at NCAR in Boulder, Colorado. The results of his team were used for the development of the actual United States Doppler weather radars network called NEXRAD.

In 1977, Atlas formed the Laboratory for Atmospheric Sciences at the NASA at the Goddard Space Flight Center in Greenbelt, Maryland. This center has produced numerous meteorological instruments to be used on weather satellites for study of the atmosphere, the oceans, and the cryosphere.

Atlas officially retired in 1984, but remained active in the meteorology research community, in particular in radar meteorology. He still worked until recently at Goddard, he is a fellow of the American Geophysical Society, the Royal Meteorological Society (RMS), and the National Academy of Engineering. Atlas is a fellow of the American Meteorological Society (AMS), and a previous president in 1975.

He received numerous awards, including the Symons Gold Medal of the RMS in 1988 and the Carl-Gustaf Rossby Research Medal in 1996 from AMS. He received in 2004, the Dennis J. Picard Medal from the Institute of Electrical and Electronics Engineers for "exceptionally outstanding leadership and significant individual technical contributions to the application of radar for the observation of weather and other atmospheric phenomena".

== Death ==
Atlas died on November 10, 2015, from complications following a stroke in Silver Spring, Maryland, at the age of 91.

== See also ==
- History of radar
- Roger Lhermitte

== Bibliography ==
- David Atlas, Radar in Meteorology: Battan Memorial and 40th Anniversary Radar Meteorology Conference, published by the American Meteorological Society, Boston, 1990, 806 pages, ISBN 0-933876-86-6, AMS Code RADMET.
- David Atlas, Reflections: A Memoir, série Historical Monograph published by the American Meteorological Society, Boston, 2001, 144 pages, ISBN 1-878220-46-2; AMS Code REFLECTIONS.
- Roger M. Wakimoto et Ramesh Srivastava: Radar and Atmospheric Science: A Collection of Essays in Honor of David Atlas, Meteorological Monograph Volume 30, issue 52 published by the American Meteorological Society, Boston, August 2003, 270 pages, ISBN 1-878220-57-8; AMS Code MM52.
