= NSSL Doppler =

S-band Doppler Weather Radar

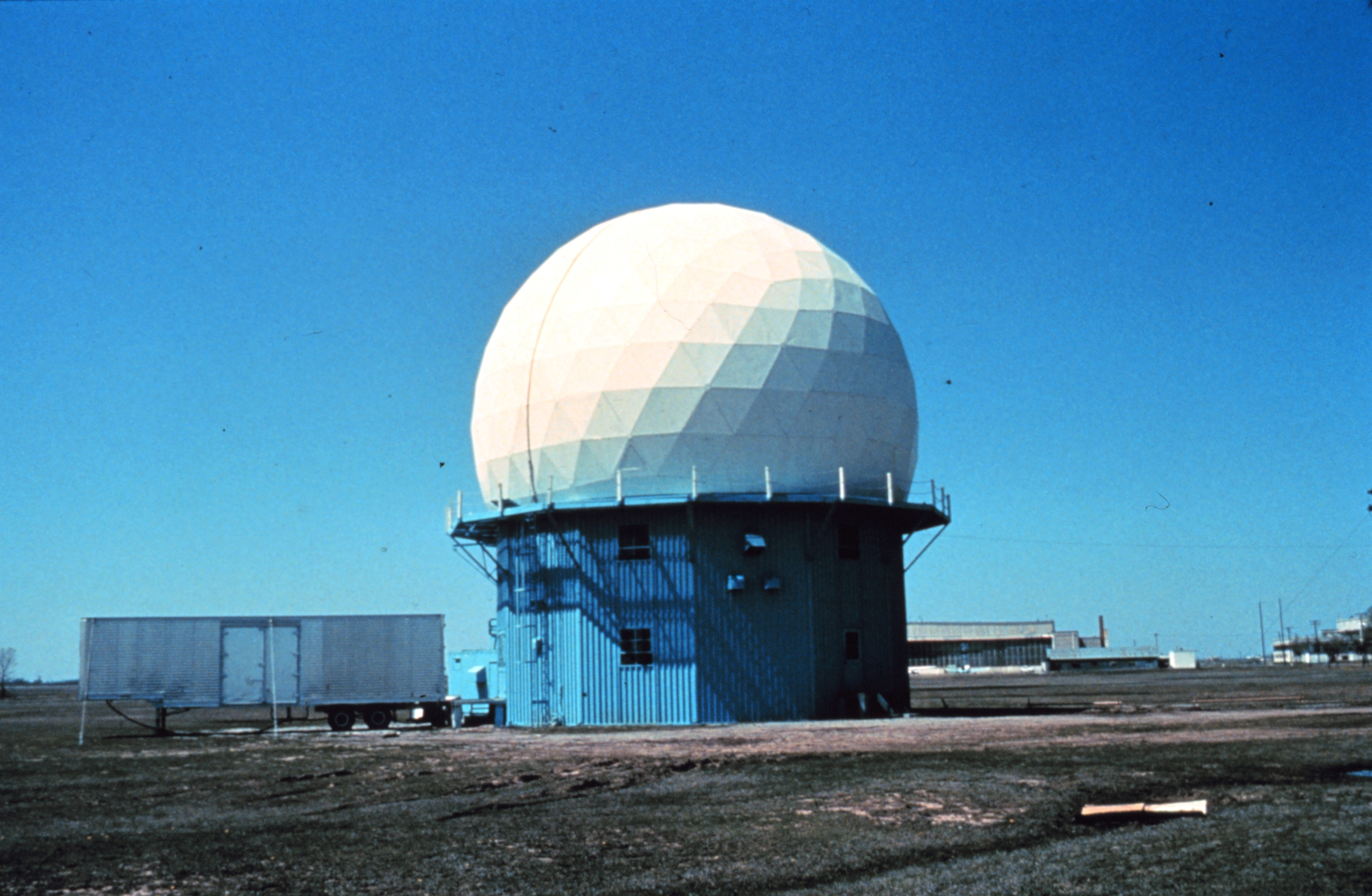
- NSSL Doppler, c. 1971
- No. built: 1
- Type: Weather radar
- Frequency: 2.7 - 2.9 GHz
- PRF: 1300 Hz (nominal)
- Pulsewidth: 1 μs (nominal)
- Diameter: 9.1 m
- Azimuth: 360º
- Elevation: 0°- 90°
- Power: 500 kW

NOAA's 10 cm Doppler Weather Radar was a 10 cm wavelength S-band Doppler Weather Radar commonly referred to as NSSL Doppler, and was used to track severe weather and related meteorological phenomena. The radar became operational soon after its donation, collecting its first data in May 1971. Data was collected on magnetic tapes and processed on a NASA computer post event due to the lack of real-time capability at the time.

== History ==
In the early 1940s, radar operators throughout Europe observed that, when using radar to track objects otherwise concealed due to distance, haze, or otherwise, precipitation was also visible, causing issues when it came to masking and objects within cores of precipitation. Into the late-1940s, scientists from Europe and the United States began to expand on the idea of radar for meteorological applications. In the mid-1950s, the advent of Doppler weather radar came into light, and many radars in the United States were soon Doppler.

== Deployment ==
Initially, the NSSL acquired a 3 cm Doppler research radar, which, for the first time, was able to measure object motion within a thunderstorm. Using the Doppler Effect, the radar would detect a change in frequency that occurred when its signal was reflected from a moving target, such as a cluster of raindrops — similar to the shift in frequency experienced with a passing sound. However, it was quickly found that 3 cm Wavelength radars were not sufficient for large-scale detection of severe weather. In 1969, the U.S. Air Force donated a surplus Bendix AN/FPS-18 Radar to the NSSL. During the 1973 summer season, this radar, equipped with Doppler capabilities, enabled the tracking of air movement within such a storm while storm chasers from the NSSL tracked the cloud in situ that produced the 1973 Union City tornado. This radar thus aided in the discovery of a radar phenomena known as a Tornado vortex signature (TVS), a small-scale Doppler velocity circulation pattern noted before or during tornadic development. After this was built, a second 10 cm Doppler Radar was built in Canadian County, Oklahoma, establishing Dual-Doppler capabilities for the first time.
