= Environmental Technology Laboratory =

The Environmental Technology Laboratory (ETL) was a laboratory in the National Oceanic and Atmospheric Administration (NOAA)/Office of Oceanic and Atmospheric Research (OAR). It was originally founded as the Wave Propagation Laboratory (WPL) in 1967 until it became the ETL in 1992. In October 2005, it was merged with five other NOAA labs to form the Earth System Research Laboratories.

ETL developed remote sensing instrumentation to allow meteorologists and oceanographers to peer inside the Earth's atmosphere to diagnose its behavior and study its interaction with land, water, and ice surfaces. ETL's engineering and scientific expertise help NOAA as it seeks to better monitor, observe, understand and describe the atmosphere so as to provide improved forecasts of its future state.
