= Michelle Hawkins =

American atmospheric scientist

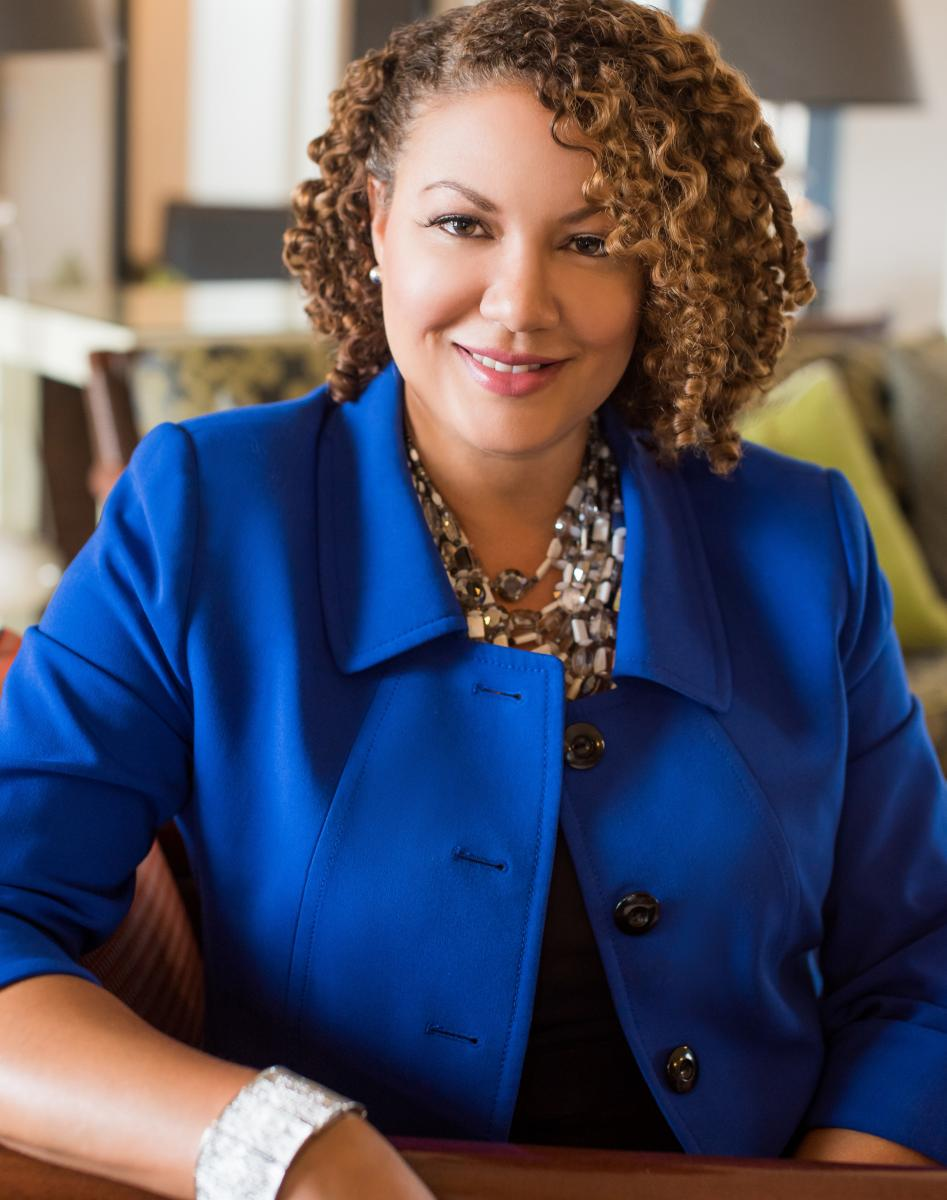
- Education: Howard University (PhD)
- Scientific career
- Institutions: National Weather Service
- Thesis: Investigation of ozone concentrations in the tropical Atlantic marine boundary layer during Saharan dust and biomass burning events (2007)

Michelle Denise Hawkins is an American atmospheric scientist and chief of the severe, fire, public and winter weather services branch at the United States National Weather Service.

== Early life and education ==
Hawkins grew up in Chicago. She earned her bachelor of sciences degree in chemistry and PhD in atmospheric science from Howard University.

== Career ==
In her role at the National Weather Service, Hawkins leads programs and policies related to severe, public, and winter weather services, as well as weather-support response services for wildland fires in support of National Weather Service land management partners. In 2014, she worked with undergraduates at Howard University in a campaign designed to expand publicly-available information about summertime weather, and in 2016 she talked with The Daily Beast about heat domes and increasing awareness of weather-related issues. Her work includes issuing high heat warnings, and considerations of optimal timing for such warnings.

In 2022, Hawkins was named a fellow of the White House Leadership Development Program, and she is assigned to the Council on Environmental Quality.

== Selected publications ==
- Weinberger, Kate R.; Zanobetti, Antonella; Schwartz, Joel; Wellenius, Gregory A. (2018-07-01). "Effectiveness of National Weather Service heat alerts in preventing mortality in 20 US cities". Environment International. 116: 30–38. doi:10.1016/j.envint.2018.03.028. ISSN 0160-4120. PMC 5970988. PMID 29649774.
- Hawkins, Michelle D.; Brown, Vankita; Ferrell, Jannie (2017-01-01). "Assessment of NOAA National Weather Service Methods to Warn for Extreme Heat Events". Weather, Climate, and Society. 9 (1): 5–13. Bibcode:2017WCS.....9....5H. doi:10.1175/WCAS-D-15-0037.1. ISSN 1948-8327. S2CID 157117268.
- Vaidyanathan, Ambarish; Saha, Shubhayu; Vicedo-Cabrera, Ana M.; Gasparrini, Antonio; Abdurehman, Nabill; Jordan, Richard; Hawkins, Michelle; Hess, Jeremy; Elixhauser, Anne (2019-03-19). "Assessment of extreme heat and hospitalizations to inform early warning systems". Proceedings of the National Academy of Sciences. 116 (12): 5420–5427. Bibcode:2019PNAS..116.5420V. doi:10.1073/pnas.1806393116. ISSN 0027-8424. PMC 6431221. PMID 30833395.

== Awards and honors ==
In 2019, Hawkins was named a "Modern Day Technology Leader" at the Black Engineer of the Year Awards.

== Personal life ==
Hawkins is a mother; she lives in Maryland.
