= Vernon R. Morris =

American atmospheric scientist

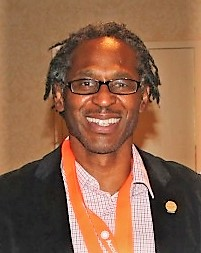
- Morris at his Colour of Weather reception in 2016
- Born: January 23, 1963 (age 63); San Antonio
- Education: Morehouse College (BA); Georgia Institute of Technology (PhD)
- Scientific career
- Workplaces: Lawrence Livermore National Laboratory; University of California, Davis; Howard University; Arizona State University
- Thesis: An investigation of transient atmospheric inorganic peroxides : a theoretical & experimental study (1991)
- Website: Vernon Morris

Vernon R. Morris (born January 23, 1963) is an American atmospheric scientist, Foundation Professor and Associate Dean of the Knowledge Enterprise in the New College of Interdisciplinary Arts and Sciences at Arizona State University. He is an Emeritus Professor in the Department of Chemistry and the former Director of the Atmospheric Sciences Program at Howard University. He was awarded the 2018 American Meteorological Society Charles E. Anderson award and the 2020 Presidential Citation for Science and Society American Geophysical Union.

== Early life and education ==
Morris was born in San Antonio. His mother and father worked for the United States Air Force, and he lived in fourteen different places as a child. He finished high school in Spokane, Washington. Morris originally thought he would follow his parents and join the United States Air Force Academy. Whilst there were no other scientists in his family, his mother's friend Carolyn Clay, an engineering professor at Rensselaer Polytechnic Institute, helped him to get into an engineering summer camp at the University of Washington. He eventually applied to Morehouse College, where he was mentored by Henry Cecil McBay. Morris went on to complete his undergraduate degree at Morehouse, where he specialised in chemistry and mathematics. Whilst at Morehouse, Morris met his future graduate advisor John H. Hall.

After an opportunity arose to join the research group of Hall as a scientist, Morris moved to the Georgia Institute of Technology (Georgia Tech), where he started a graduate programme in atmospheric science. Throughout his graduate studies he worked as an instructor at Spelman College. His doctoral research considered atmospheric inorganic chlorine oxides (peroxides), and he was awarded a NASA graduate research fellowship to support his studies. His work combined experimental and theoretical investigations to better understand how chlorine oxides contributed to the depletion of stratospheric ozone. In 1991, Morris became the first African-American to earn a doctorate in atmospheric science at Georgia Tech. After completing his doctorate, Morris moved to Lawrence Livermore National Laboratory, where he was made a Ford Foundation fellow.

== Research and career ==
Morris joined the University of California, Davis, where he was awarded a President's Postdoctoral Fellowship. At UC Davis, Morris studied the dynamics of free radical systems. In 1996 Morris moved to Howard University, where he was appointed deputy director of the Center for the Study of Terrestrial and Extraterrestrial Atmospheres. His research looks to understand how atmospheric particulates influence the atmosphere and climate across multiple spatio-temporal scales. He served as Director of the Howard University component of the Goddard Space Flight Center Earth Science and Technology Center. In this capacity, Morris spent two years at Goddard, where he studied the movement of aerosols and dust from Asia across the Pacific Ocean.

At Howard University, Morris was the founding director of the National Oceanic and Atmospheric Administration (NOAA) Cooperative Science Center in Atmospheric Sciences and Meteorology. His research considered trace gases and aerosols in the urban environment. To understand the impact of these at a global scale, Morris directed several observation missions on board the NOAA Ship Ronald H. Brown. Amongst these missions were the AERosols and Oceanographic Science Expeditions (AEROSE), which involved investigations into the air mass outflows of Africa. These outflows included particulates from the Sahara desert and aerosols from the burning of biomass due to slash-and-burn agriculture. Such aerosols can influence the transfer of microbes across hemispheres (microbiological transfer), which can impact cloud formation and precipitation. Through these investigations Morris was able to create the world's most comprehensive data set of atmospheric measurements and oceanographic information. These studies permit the characterisation of the environmental impacts of Saharan dust aerosols as they move across the Atlantic Ocean.

In July 2020 Morris joined the faculty at Arizona State University as the Director of the School of Mathematical and Natural Sciences at the New College of Interdisciplinary Arts and Sciences.

== Academic service ==
As of 2017, in the United States, fewer than 0.1% of geoscience doctoral students are African American or Native American. In an interview with Chalkdust magazine, Morris remarked, "if you never see any African American professors, or very rarely see them, then you don't see yourself becoming one, and you say to yourself maybe I should do something else,".

Morris has dedicated his scientific career to mentoring students and early career researchers from underserved backgrounds. In 2001 Morris founded the Howard University (HU) Graduate Program in Atmospheric Sciences (HUPAS), which was the first atmospheric science doctoral programme at a minority serving institution. Under his leadership, HUPAS became a national leader in the graduation of minority atmospheric science researchers; between 2006 and 2016 HUPAS produced half of all African-American doctoral graduates in the United States.

Alongside working to support early career researchers, Morris has created educational programmes for young people. He designed a series of weather camps for students in the United States and Puerto Rico, which included courses in weather, climate and the environment. Almost 70% of the students who participate in the weather camps are African-American or Latinx. During his time at Howard University, Morris encouraged his research group to visit schools in the District of Columbia Public School system and lead interactive education programmes as part of a 'travelling science show' which became known as Community Science Fests. Beyond Washington, D.C., these events took place in Brazil, Barbados, Uruguay, the Philippines, Ethiopia and Sudan. He has worked with Talitha Washington on programmes that promote STEMM diversity. He is a member of the National Academy of Sciences Board on Atmospheric Science and the Climate.

== Awards and honours ==
- Class of 1997 Project Kaleidoscope Faculty for the 21st Century
- American Meteorological Society Charles E. Anderson award
- Elected a Fellow of the American Meteorological Society
- Fulbright Specialist Award
- National Organization for the Professional Advancement of Black Chemists and Chemical Engineers Henry Cecil McBay Outstanding Teacher Award

== Personal life ==
Morris has three daughters and a son.

== Selected publications ==
- Greene, Natasha A.; Morris, Vernon R. (2006). "Assessment of Public Health Risks Associated with Atmospheric Exposure to PM2.5 in Washington, DC, USA". International Journal of Environmental Research and Public Health. 3 (1): 86–97. doi:10.3390/ijerph2006030010. PMC 3785683. PMID 16823080.
- Nalli, Nicholas R.; Barnet, Christopher D.; Reale, Anthony; Tobin, David; Gambacorta, Antonia; Maddy, Eric S.; Joseph, Everette; Sun, Bomin; Borg, Lori; Mollner, Andrew K.; Morris, Vernon R. (2013). "Validation of satellite sounder environmental data records: Application to the Cross-track Infrared Microwave Sounder Suite". Journal of Geophysical Research: Atmospheres. 118 (24): 13, 628–13, 643. Bibcode:2013JGRD..11813628N. doi:10.1002/2013JD020436. ISSN 2169-8996.
- Morris, Vernon R.; Bhatia, Subhash C.; Hall, John H. (1991). "Ab-initio self-consistent-field study of the vibrational spectra for NO3 geometric isomers. 2. Isotopic shifts of sym-NO3". The Journal of Physical Chemistry. 95 (23): 9203–9208. doi:10.1021/j100176a032. ISSN 0022-3654.
