= National Severe Storms Laboratory =

Weather research laboratory

- Abbreviation: NSSL
- Formation: 1964
- Headquarters: Norman, Oklahoma
- Coordinates: 35°10′53″N 97°26′24″W
- Director: DaNa Carlis
- Senior Scientist: Dusan S. Zrnic
- Deputy Director for Science: Pam Heinselman
- Associate Director for Administration: Kurt Hondl
- Parent organization: National Oceanic and Atmospheric Administration
- Website: https://www.nssl.noaa.gov/

The National Severe Storms Laboratory (NSSL) is a National Oceanic and Atmospheric Administration (NOAA) weather research laboratory under the Office of Oceanic and Atmospheric Research. It is one of seven NOAA Research Laboratories (RLs).

NSSL studies weather radar, tornadoes, flash floods, lightning, damaging winds, hail, and winter weather out of Norman, Oklahoma, using various techniques and tools in their HWT, or Hazardous Weather Testbed. NSSL meteorologists developed the first Doppler radar for the purpose of meteorological observation, and contributed to the development of the NEXRAD (WSR-88D).

NSSL has a partnership with the Cooperative Institute for Severe and High-Impact Weather Research and Operations (CIWRO) at the University of Oklahoma that enables collaboration and participation by students and visiting scientists in performing research. The Lab also works closely with the Storm Prediction Center (SPC) and the National Weather Service Norman Forecast Office, which are co-located at the National Weather Center (NWC) in Norman, Oklahoma. The NWC houses a combination of University of Oklahoma, NOAA and state organizations that work in collaboration.

== History ==
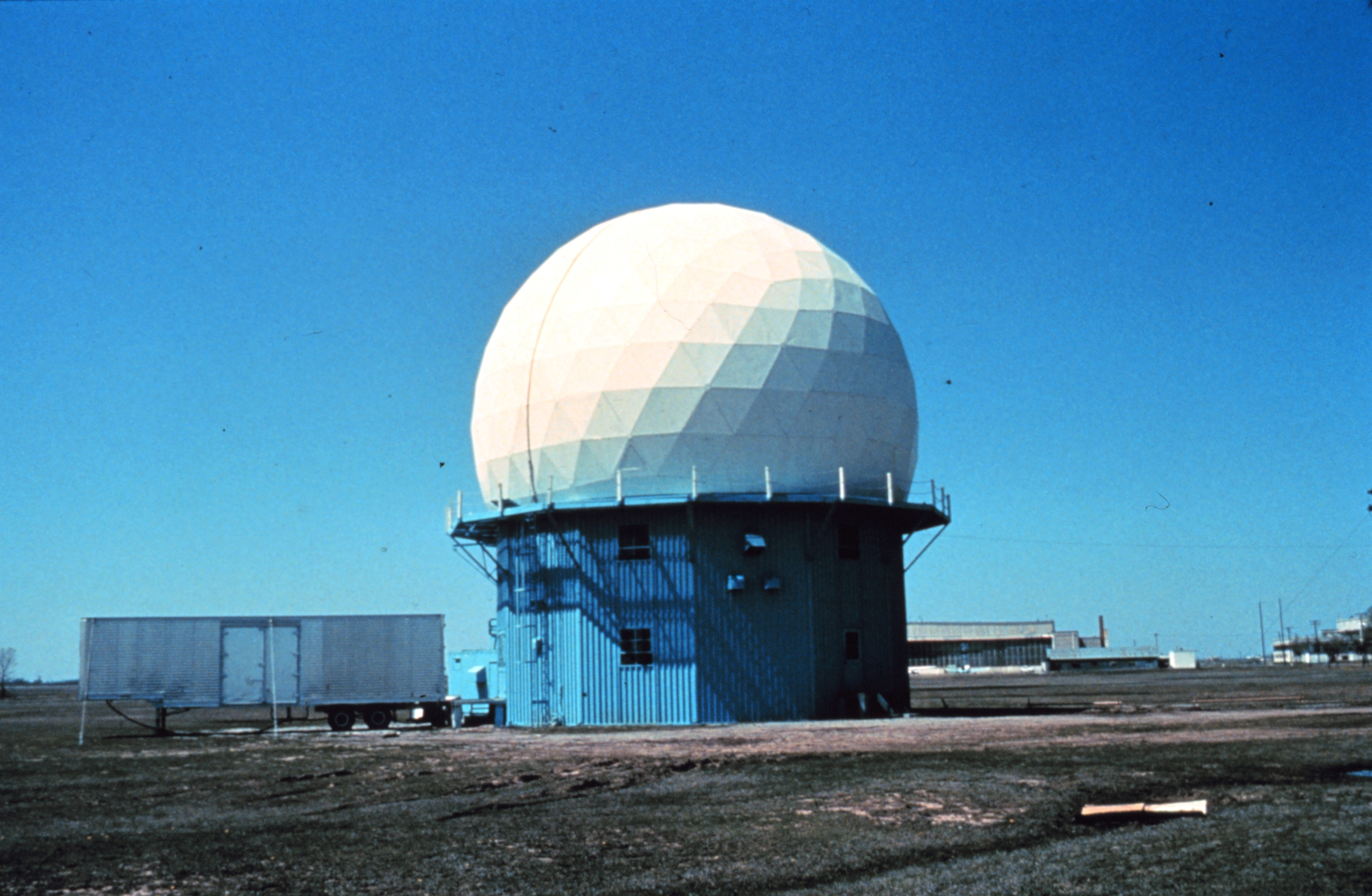
NSSL's first Doppler weather radar, the NSSL Doppler, located in Norman, Oklahoma. 1970s research using this radar led to NWS NEXRAD WSR-88D radar network.

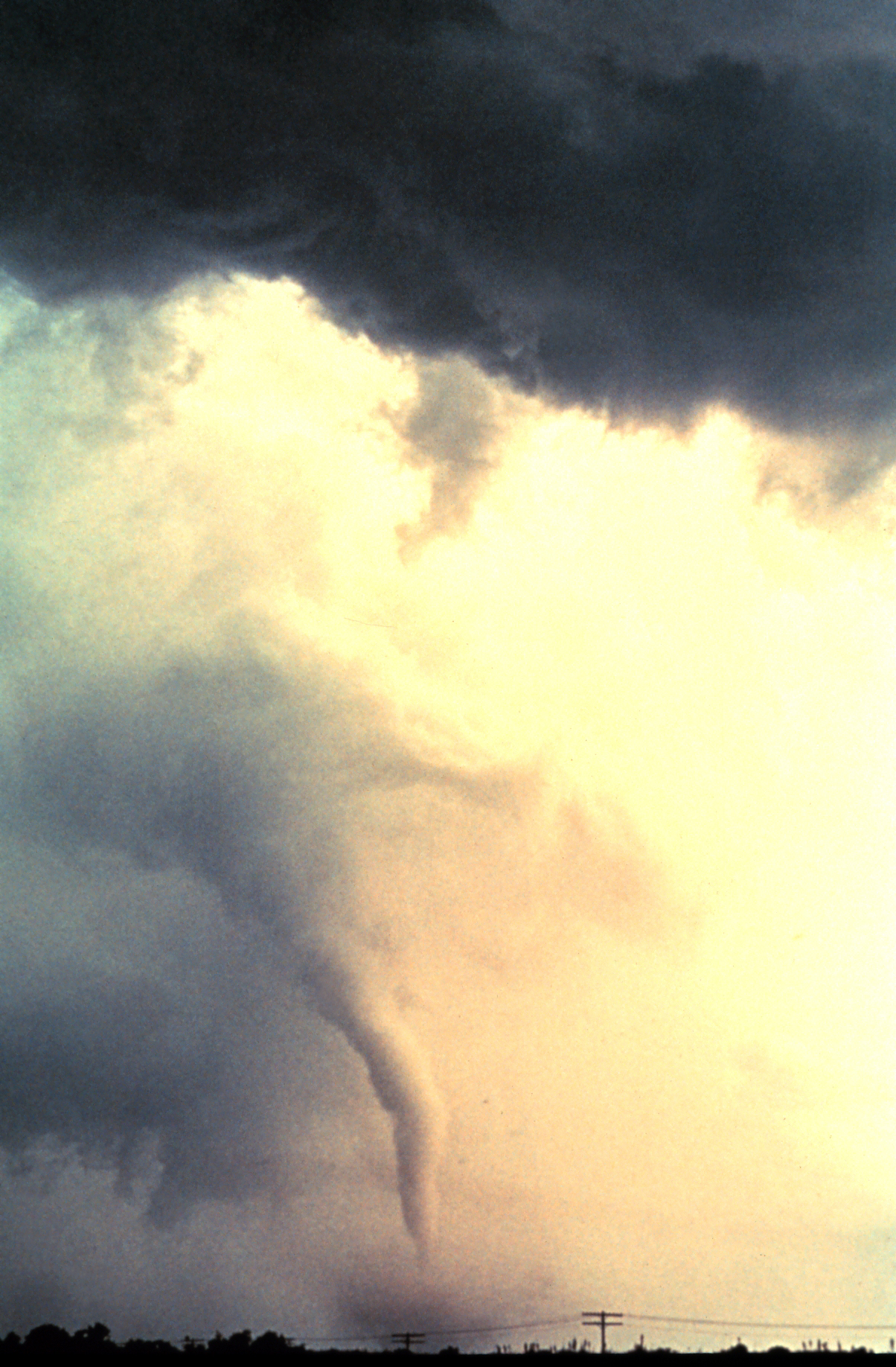
The first tornado captured, 24 May 1973, by the NSSL Doppler weather radar and NSSL chase personnel. The tornado is here in its early stage of formation near Union City, Oklahoma

In 1962 a research team from the United States Weather Bureau's National Severe Storms Project (NSSP) moved from Kansas City, Missouri, to Norman, Oklahoma, where, in 1956, the Cornell Aeronautical Laboratory had installed a 3 cm continuous-wave Doppler Weather Surveillance Radar-1957 (WSR-57). This radar was designed to detect very high wind speeds in tornadoes, but could not determine the distance to the tornadoes. In 1963, the Weather Radar Laboratory (WRL) was established in Norman and, in the following year, engineers modified the radar to transmit in pulses. The pulse-Doppler radar could receive data in between each transmit pulse, eliminating the need for two antennas and solving the distance problem.

In 1964, the remainder of the NSSP moved to Norman, where it merged with WRL and was renamed the National Severe Storms Laboratory (NSSL). Dr. Edwin Kessler became the first director. In 1969, NSSL obtained a surplus 10-cm pulse-Doppler radar from the United States Air Force. This radar was used to scan and film the complete life cycle of a tornado in 1973. By comparing the film with velocity images from the radar, the researchers found a pattern that showed the tornado beginning to form before it could be visually detected on the film. The researchers named this phenomenon the Tornado Vortex Signature (TVS). Research using this radar led to the concept that would later go on to become the NWS NEXRAD WSR-88D radar network. In 1973, the Laboratory commissioned a second Doppler weather radar, named the Cimarron radar, located 15 miles (24 km) west of Oklahoma City. This enabled NSSL to perform dual Doppler experiments while scanning storms with both radars simultaneously. A deliberate decision to collocate research with operations led the National Severe Storms Forecast Center to move from Kansas City to Norman in 1997, changing its name to the Storm Prediction Center. This move would allow for improved collaborations between NSSL and SPC. Some three years later in 2000, the first NOAA Hazardous Weather Testbed (HWT) Spring Experiment took place. This would become an annual event to evaluate operational and experimental models and algorithms with the NWS.

== Organization ==
NSSL is organized into three primary branches:

- Collaborative Observations, Research, & Engineering (CORE)
- Analysis & Understanding Branch (AUB)
- Innovations in Modeling, Predictions, Applications, Communication, & Testbeds (IMPACT)

== Forecast Research & Development ==
=== FACETs ===
Forecasting a Continuum of Environmental Threats (FACETs) serves as a broad-based framework and strategy to help focus and direct efforts related to next-generation science, technology and tools for forecasting environmental hazards. FACETS will address grid-based probabilistic threats, storm-scale observations and guidance, the forecaster, threat grid tools, useful output, effective response, and verification.

=== Warn-on-Forecast ===
The Warn-on-Forecast (WoF) research project aims to deliver a set of technologies for FACETs on a variety of space and time scales. WoF aims to create computer-model projections that accurately predict storm-scale phenomena such as tornadoes, large hail, and extremely localized rainfall. If Warn-on-Forecast is successful, forecasts likely could improve lead time by factors of 2 to 4 times.

=== NSSL-WRF ===
The Weather Research and Forecast (WRF) model is the product of a collaboration between the meteorological research and forecasting communities. Working at the interface between research and operations, NSSL scientists have been some of the main contributors to WRF development efforts and continue to provide operational implementation and testing of WRF. The NSSL WRF generates daily, real-time 1- to 36-hour experimental forecasts at a 4 km resolution of precipitation, lightning threat, and more.

=== WoF Tornado Threat Prediction ===
WoF Tornado Threat Prediction (WoF-TTP) is a research project to develop a 0–1 hour, 1-km resolution suite of high detail computer models to forecast individual convective storms and their tornadic potential. Target future average lead-time for tornado warnings via WoF-TTP is 40–60 minutes. The technology and science developed to achieve the WoF-TTP goal hopes to improve the prediction of other convective weather threats such as large hail and damaging winds.

=== NME ===
NSSL's Mesoscale Ensemble (NME) is an experimental analysis and short-range ensemble forecast system. These forecasts are designed to be used by forecasters as a 3-D hourly analysis of the environment.

=== Q2 ===
The National Mosaic and Multi-sensor Quantitative Precipitation Estimation (NMQ) system uses a combination of observing systems ranging from radars to satellites on a national scale to produce precipitation forecasts. NMQ's prototype QPE products are also known as “Q2” - next-generation products combining the most effective multi-sensor techniques to estimate precipitation.

=== NEXRAD ===
NSSL scientists helped develop the Weather Surveillance Radar - 1988 Doppler (WSR-88D) radars, also known as NEXt-generation RADar (NEXRAD). Since the first Doppler weather radar became operational in Norman in 1974, NSSL has worked to extend its functionality, and proved to the NOAA National Weather Service (NWS) that Doppler weather radar was important as a nowcasting tool. The NWS now has a network of 158 NEXRADs.

=== Dual-Polarized Weather Radar (Dual-Pol) ===
Dual-polarized (dual-pol) radar technology is truly a NOAA-wide accomplishment. NSSL spent nearly 30 years researching and developing the technology. The National Weather Service (NWS) and NSSL developed the specifications for the modification, which was tested by engineers at the NWS Radar Operations Center. The NWS Warning Decision Training Branch provided timely and relevant training to all NWS forecasters who would be using the technology. The upgraded radars offer 14 new radar products to better determine the type and intensity of precipitation, and can confirm tornadoes are on the ground causing damage. Dual-pol is the most significant enhancement made to the nation's radar network since Doppler radar was first installed in the early 1990s.

=== Multi-Function Phased Array Radar (MPAR) ===
More than 350 FAA radars and by 2025, nearly 150 of the nation's Doppler weather radars will need to be either replaced or have their service life extended. Phased array radars have been used by the military for many years to track aircraft. NSSL's MPAR program is investigating to see if both the aircraft surveillance and weather surveillance functions can be combined into one radar. Combining the operational capabilities of these various radar systems into a single radar unit would result in fiscal savings and consume fewer resources.

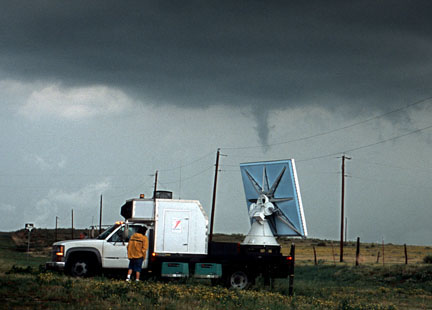
A mobile Doppler Radar truck. (DOW 5)

=== Mobile Radar ===
NSSL researchers teamed up with several universities to build a mobile Doppler radar: a Doppler radar mounted on the back of a truck. The mobile radar can be driven into position as a storm is developing to scan the atmosphere at low levels, below the beam of WSR-88D radars. NSSL has used mobile radars to study tornadoes, hurricanes, dust storms, winter storms, mountain rainfall, and even biological phenomena.

== Warning Research & Development ==
=== FACETs ===
Forecasting a Continuum of Environmental Threats (FACETs) serves as a broad-based framework and strategy to help focus and direct efforts related to next-generation science, technology and tools for forecasting environmental hazards. FACETs will address grid-based probabilistic threats, storm-scale observations and guidance, the forecaster, threat grid tools, useful output, effective response, and verification.

=== MYRORSS ===
The Multi-Year Reanalysis Of Remotely-Sensed Storms (MYRORSS – pronounced "mirrors") NSSL and the National Climatic Data Center (NCDC) to reconstruct and evaluate numerical model output and radar products derived from 15 years of WSR-88D data over the coterminous U.S. (CONUS). The end result of this research is intended to be a database with multiple uses including severe weather diagnosis and climatological information.

=== Hazardous Weather Testbed ===
NOAA's Hazardous Weather Testbed (HWT) is jointly managed by NSSL, the Storm Prediction Center (SPC) and the National Weather Service Oklahoma City/Norman Weather Forecast Office (OUN) on the University of Oklahoma campus inside the National Weather Center. The HWT is designed to accelerate the transition of promising new meteorological insights and technologies into advances in forecasting and warning for hazardous mesoscale weather events throughout the United States.

=== Threats in Motion ===
One of the new warning methodologies being tested in the NOAA Hazardous Weather Testbed is the “Threats-In-Motion” (TIM) concept. TIM warning grids update every minute and move continuously with the path of the storm. TIM has the advantage of providing useful lead times for all locations downstream of the hazards, and continually removes the warning from areas where threat has already passed.

=== FLASH ===
The Flooded Locations And Simulated Hydrographs Project (FLASH) was launched in early 2012 to improve the accuracy and timing of flash flood warnings. FLASH uses forecast models, geographic information, and real-time high-resolution, accurate rainfall observations from the NMQ/Q2 project to produce flash flood forecasts at 1-km/5-min resolution. FLASH project development continues to be an active collaboration between members of NSSL's Stormscale Hydrometeorology and Hydromodeling Groups, and the HyDROS Lab at the University of Oklahoma.

=== CI-FLOW ===
The Coastal and Inland Flooding Observation and Warning (CI-FLOW) project is a demonstration projection that predicts the combined effects of coastal and inland floods for coastal North Carolina. CI-FLOW captures the complex interaction between rainfall, river flows, waves, and tides and storm surge, and how they will impact ocean and river water levels. NSSL, with support from the NOAA National Sea Grant, leads the large and unique interdisciplinary team.

== Decision Support ==
In an effort to support NWS forecasters, NSSL investigates methods and techniques to diagnose severe weather events more quickly and accurately.

=== AWIPS2 ===
NSSL has more than ten NWS workstations—the Advanced Weather Interactive Processing System 2 (AWIPS2)—available for use in product evaluation. NSSL uses these AWIPS2 stations to test and demonstrate warning products and techniques that have been developed here that will be available in the NWS Forecast Office in the future.

=== WDSS-II ===
In the 1990s, NSSL developed the Warning Decision Support System, to enhance NWS warning capabilities. NSSL continues to work on the next generation WDSS-II (Warning Decision Support System: Integrated Information/NMQ), a tool that quickly combines data streams from multiple radars, surface and upper air observations, lightning detection systems, and satellite and forecast models. This improved and expanded system will eventually be moved to National Weather Service operations as the Multi-Radar Multi-Sensor (MRMS) system, and will automatically produce severe weather and precipitation products for improved decision-making capability within NOAA.

=== NSSL: On-Demand ===
NSSL: On-Demand is a web-based tool based on WDSS-II that helps confirm when and where severe weather occurred by mapping radar-detected circulations or hail on Google Earth satellite images. National Weather Service (NWS) forecast offices, including those affected by the 2011 Super Outbreak, use the images to plan post event damage surveys. Emergency responders use On-Demand to produce high-resolution street maps of affected areas, so they can more effectively begin rescue and recovery efforts and damage assessments.

=== NSSL Development Lab ===
NSSL's Development Lab includes four wall-mounted plasma screen displays and enough room for at least 10 workstations. A large round table occupies the middle of the room for lunchtime “brown bag” discussions and other meetings. Researchers, forecasters and developers are using the lab to evaluate new platforms and techniques in real-time as a team. The workstations in the lab can be quickly adapted for visualization and incorporation of unique data sources including dual-pol and phased array radars.

=== NMQ ===
NSSL created a powerful research and development tool for the creation of new techniques, strategies and applications to better estimate and forecast precipitation amounts, locations and types. The National Mosaic and Multi-sensor Quantitative Precipitation Estimation system (NMQ) uses a combination of observing systems ranging from radars to satellites on a national scale to produce precipitation forecasts.

=== MRMS ===
The MRMS (Multi-Radar Multi-Sensor) system is the proposed operational version of the Warning Decision Support System - Integrated Information (WDSS-II) and the National Mosaic Quantitative Precipitation Estimation system.

MRMS is a system with automated algorithms that quickly and intelligently integrate data streams from multiple radars, surface and upper air observations, lightning detection systems, and satellite and forecast models. Numerous two-dimensional multiple-sensor products offer assistance for hail, wind, tornado, quantitative precipitation estimation forecasts, convection, icing, and turbulence diagnosis. The MRMS system was developed to produce severe weather and precipitation products for improved decision-making capability to improve severe weather forecasts and warnings, hydrology, aviation, and numerical weather prediction.

=== 3D-VAR ===
A weather-adaptive three-dimensional variational data assimilation (3DVAR) system from NSSL/CIWRO automatically detects and analyzes supercell thunderstorms. The 3DVAR system uses data from the national WSR-88D radar network and NCEP's North American Mesoscale model product to automatically locate regions of thunderstorm activity. It is able to identify deep rotating updrafts that indicate a supercell thunderstorm at 1 km resolution every five minutes in these regions.

== Field Research ==
NSSL participates in field research projects to collect weather data to increase knowledge about thunderstorm behavior and thunderstorm hazards.

=== Plains Elevated Convection At Night (PECAN) (2015) ===
PECAN was an extensive field project that focused on nighttime convection. PECAN was conducted across northern Oklahoma, central Kansas and into south-central Nebraska from 1 June to 15 July 2015.

=== VORTEX2 (2009-2010) ===
NSSL participated in the Verification of the Origins of Rotation in Tornadoes EXperiment 2009-2010, an extensive project studying small scale kinematics, atmospheric variables and when and why tornadoes form. The National Oceanic and Atmospheric Administration (NOAA) and National Science Foundation (NSF) supported more than 100 scientists, students and staff from around the world to collect weather measurements around and under thunderstorms that could produce tornadoes.

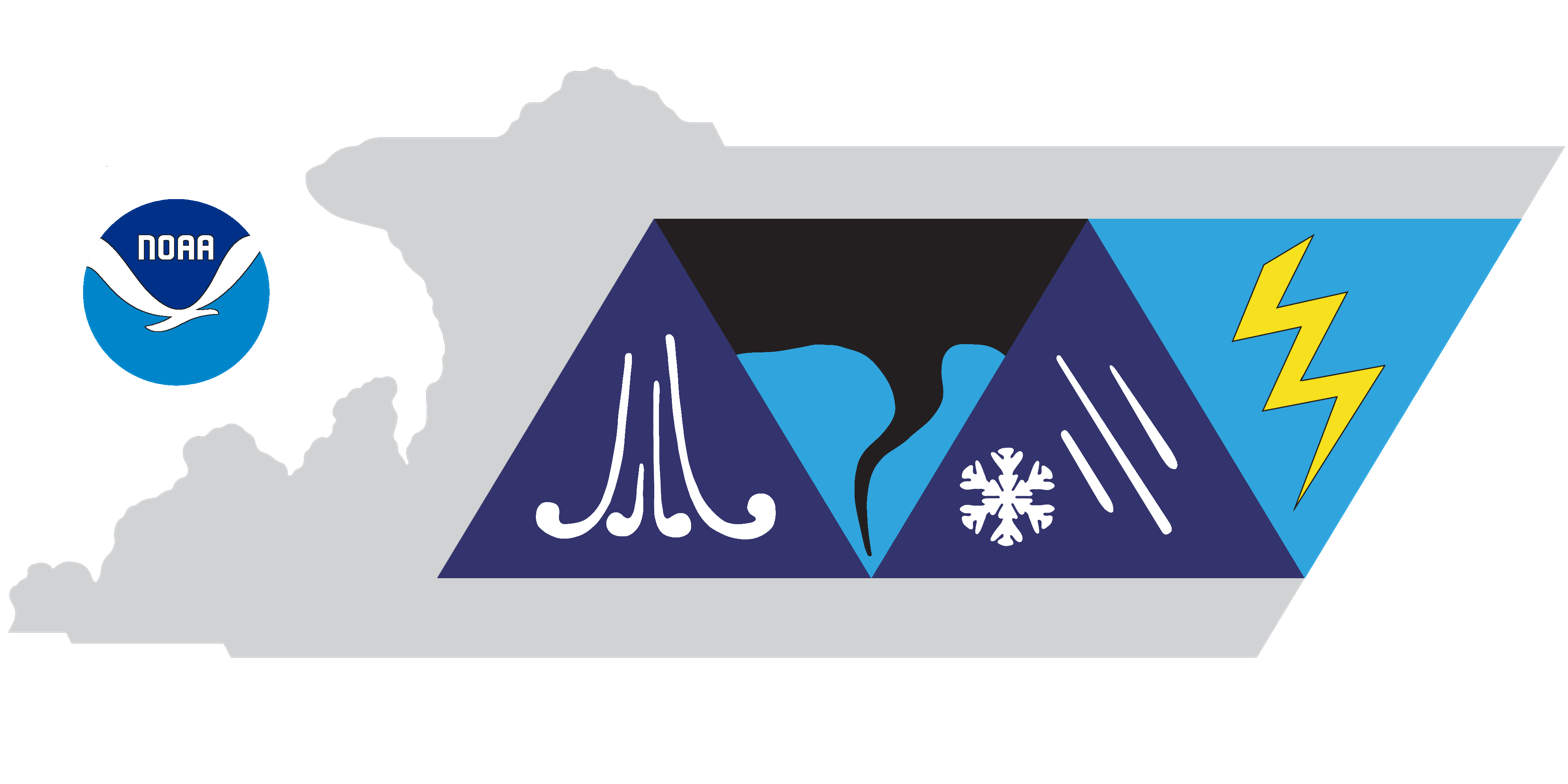
The official logo of the NOAA NSSL in the mid-90s.

=== VORTEX (1994-1995) ===
The Verification of the Origins of Rotation in Tornadoes EXperiment was a two-year project designed to verify a number of ongoing questions about the causes of tornado formation. A new mobile Doppler radar was used and provided revolutionary data on several tornadic storms.

=== TOTO (1981-1987) ===
The TOtable TOrnado Observatory (TOTO), developed by NOAA Environmental Research Laboratory scientists, was a 55-gallon barrel outfitted with anemometers, pressure sensors, and humidity sensors, along with devices to record the data. In theory, a team would roll TOTO out of the back of the pickup in the path of a tornado, switch on the instruments, and get out of the way. Several groups tried to deploy TOTO over the years, but never took a direct hit. The closest TOTO ever came to success was in 1984 when it was sideswiped by the edge of a weak tornado and was knocked over. TOTO was retired in 1987.

=== Project Rough Rider (1980s) ===
Aircraft flew into thunderstorms to measure turbulence in the 1960s, 1970s and early 1980s. This data was combined with measurements of the intensity of the rain from nearby WSR-57s to understand how thunderstorm echoes and turbulence are related, with the goal of improving short-term turbulence forecasts.

== Observation ==
=== Field Observing Systems ===
==== Mobile Mesonet ====
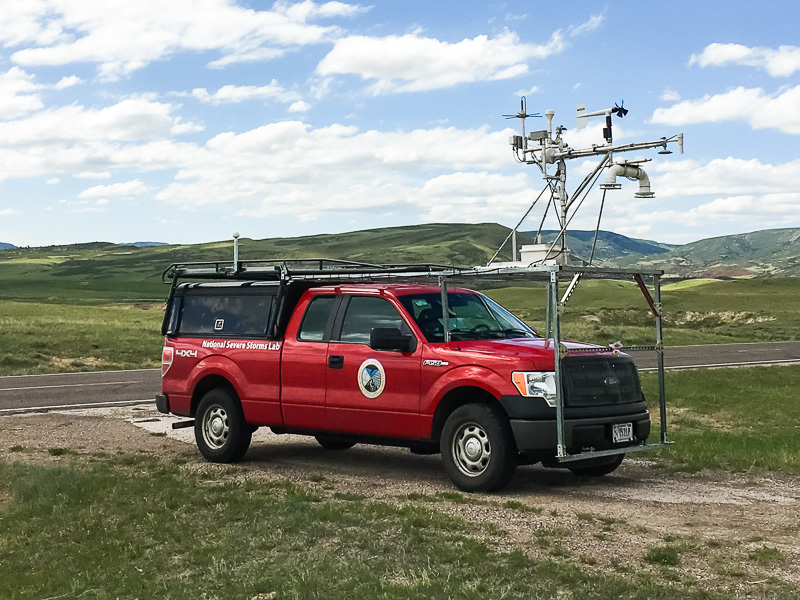
A mobile mesonet system operating under the NOAA's NSSL in 2017

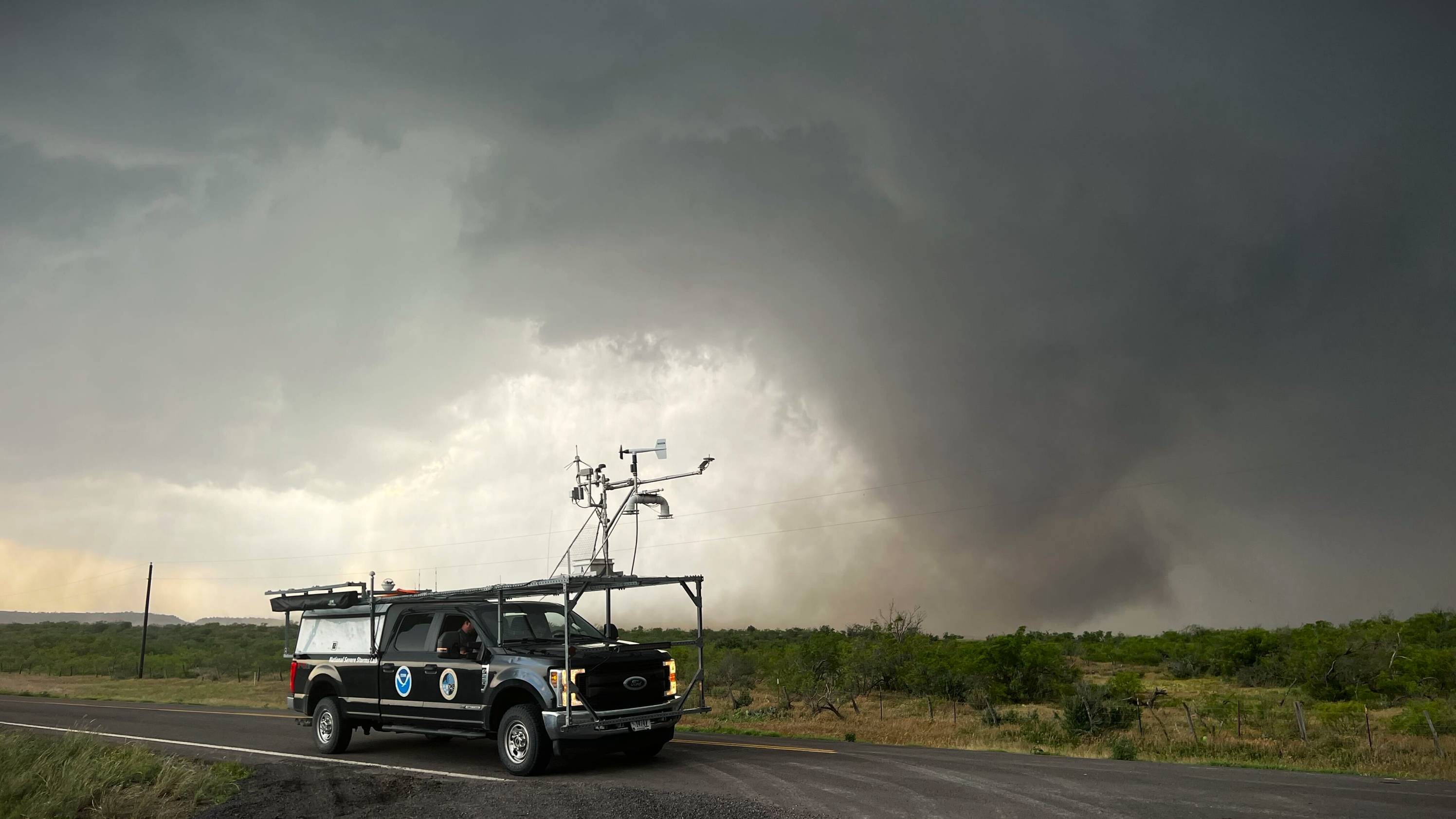
An NSSL Mobile Mesonet Truck chasing the 2024 Duke, Oklahoma tornado.

Scientists and technicians from NSSL and the University of Oklahoma built their first Mobile Mesonet (MM) vehicles, a.k.a. “probes,” in 1992. Probes are modified minivans with a suite of weather instruments mounted atop a roof rack and a complex of computer and communication equipment inside. NSSL scientists drive these through storms and storm environments to make measurements of temperature, pressure, humidity and wind.

==== 2-Dimensional Video Distrometer (2DVD) ====
NSSL's 2DVD takes high speed video pictures, from two different angles, of anything falling from the sky through its viewing area (such as raindrops, hail or snow). It is used in polarimetric radar studies by measuring rain rate, drop shape and size distribution, and other parameters useful in narrowing down the accuracy of precipitation identification algorithms.

==== Portable Observation Device (POD) ====
NSSL has available small portable weather platforms with sensors that measure temperature, pressure, moisture, wind speed and direction, and an instrument called a Parsivel (PARticle, SIze, VELocity) disdrometer. These can be deployed quickly in the field, in and around thunderstorms.

==== Weather balloons ====
NSSL launches special research weather balloon systems into thunderstorms. Measurements from the sensor packages attached to the balloons provide data about conditions inside the storm where it has often proved too dangerous for research aircraft to fly.

==== Particle Size Image and Velocity Probe (PASIV) ====
PASIV is a balloon-borne instrument designed to capture images of water and ice particles as it is launched into, and rises up through, a thunderstorm. The instrument is flown as part of a “train” of other instruments connected one after another to a balloon. These other instruments measure electrical field strength and direction, and other variables such as temperature, dewpoint, pressure and winds.

==== Collaborative Lower Atmospheric Mobile Profiling System (CLAMPS) ====
NSSL has a mobile, trailer-based boundary layer profiling facility using commercially available sensors. CLAMPS contains a Doppler lidar, a multi-channel microwave radiometer, and an Atmospheric Emitted Radiance Interferometer (AERI). CLAMPS meets a NOAA/NWS operational and research need of for profiles of temperature, humidity, and winds near the surface of the earth.

==== Electric Field Meters (EFM) ====
NSSL's Field Observing Facilities and Support group (FOFS) is responsible for a device called an Electric Field Meter (EFM) that is attached, along with other instruments, to a special research balloon and launched into thunderstorms. As they are carried up through electrified storms, these EFMs are designed to measure the strength and direction of the electric fields that build up before lightning strikes occur. Data from this instrument helps researchers learn more about the electrical structure of storms.

==== Mobile laboratories ====
NSSL operates two mobile laboratories (custom built by an ambulance company) called NSSL6 and NSSL7, outfitted with computer and communication systems, balloon launching equipment, and weather instruments. These mobile labs can be deployed on a rapid basis to collect data or coordinate field operations.

==== Mobile Doppler radar ====
NSSL researchers with the University of Oklahoma built their first mobile Doppler weather radar in 1993. Current versions of mobile radars (for example, NSSL's NOXP) can be driven into positions very close to storms, observing details that are typically out of sight of the beam of more distant WSR-88D radars. NSSL has also used mobile radars to study tornadoes, hurricanes, dust storms, winter storms, mountain rainfall, and even biological phenomena.

=== Fixed Observing Systems ===
==== Oklahoma Lightning Mapping Array (OKLMA) ====
NSSL installed, operates and maintains the OKLMA. Thousands of points can be mapped for an individual lightning flash to reveal its location and the development of its structure. NSSL scientists hope to learn more about how storms produce intra-cloud and cloud-to-ground flashes and how each type is related to tornadoes and other severe weather.

==== Satellite ====
NSSL researchers are working on products that use GOES satellite data to identify rapidly growing clouds that might indicate a developing thunderstorm. They are also working on products that estimate wind shear and stability in the surrounding environment to forecast the future severity of the storm.

==== Boundary layer profilers ====
NSSL uses special instruments mounted on the top of the National Weather Center that can measure the thermodynamic properties of the lowest 1–2 km of the atmosphere (boundary layer). Researchers study the data to learn more about the structure of the boundary layer, shallow convective cloud processes, the interaction between clouds, aerosols, radiation, precipitation and the thermodynamic environment, mixed phase clouds, and more. Numerical models, such as those used for climate and weather prediction, have large uncertainties in all of these areas. Researchers also use these observations to improve our understanding and representation of these processes.

==== SHAVE ====
NSSL draws upon observations from the public as well through the mostly student-run NSSL/CIWRO Severe Hazards Analysis and Verification Experiment (SHAVE), which collects hail, wind damage, and flash flooding reports through phone surveys. Combined with voluntary reports collected by the NWS, SHAVE reports create a unique and comprehensive database of severe and non-severe weather events and enhance climatological information about severe storm threats in the U.S.

==== mPING ====
Another way NSSL uses public observations is through the Meteorological Phenomena Identification Near the Ground (mPING) project. Volunteers can report on the precipitation that is reaching the ground at their location through mobile apps (iOS and Android). Researchers compare the reports of precipitation with what is detected by the dual-polarized radar data to refine precipitation identification algorithms.

== Simulation ==
NSSL researchers have created a computer model that can simulate a thunderstorm to study how changes in the environment can affect its behavior. They also contribute to the development of the Weather Research and Forecast (WRF) model used in both research and NWS operations.

=== NSSL WRF ===
The Weather Research and Forecast (WRF) model is the product of a collaboration between the meteorological research and forecasting communities. Its level of sophistication is appropriate for cutting edge research, yet it operates efficiently enough to produce guidance for front-line forecasters in a timely manner. Working at the interface between research and operations, NSSL scientists have been major contributors to WRF development efforts and continue to provide leadership in the operational implementation and testing of WRF. The NSSL WRF generates real-time 1- to 36-hour experimental forecasts at a 4 km resolution of precipitation, lightning threat, and more.

=== COMMAS ===
The NSSL COllaborative Model for Multiscale Atmospheric Simulation (COMMAS) is a 3D cloud model used to recreate thunderstorms for closer study. COMMAS is able to ingest radar data and lightning data from past events. Researchers use COMMAS to explore the microphysical structure and evolution of the storm and the relationship between microphysics and storm electricity. They also use COMMAS to simulate different phases of significant events, such as the early tornadic phase of the Greensburg, Kansas supercell that destroyed much of the town in 2004.

=== FLASH ===
The Flooded Locations And Simulated Hydrographs Project (FLASH) was launched in early 2012 largely in response to the demonstration and real-time availability of high-resolution, accurate rainfall observations from the NMQ/Q2 project. FLASH introduces a new paradigm in flash flood prediction that uses the NMQ forcing and produces flash flood forecasts at 1-km/5-min resolution through direct, forward simulation. The primary goal of the FLASH project is to improve the accuracy, timing, and specificity of flash flood warnings in the US, thus saving lives and protecting infrastructure. The FLASH team is composed of researchers and students who use an interdisciplinary and collaborative approach to achieve the goal.

== Testbeds ==
=== Hazardous Weather Testbed ===
NOAA's Hazardous Weather Testbed (HWT) is jointly managed by NSSL, the Storm Prediction Center (SPC) and the National Weather Service Oklahoma City/Norman Weather Forecast Office (OUN) on the University of Oklahoma campus inside the National Weather Center. The HWT is designed to accelerate the transition of promising new meteorological insights and technologies into advances in forecasting and warning for hazardous mesoscale weather events throughout the United States.

=== National Weather Radar Testbed ===
NOAA's National Weather Radar Testbed (NWRT) is a phased array radar (PAR) being tested and evaluated in Norman, Oklahoma. The NWRT was established to demonstrate the potential to simultaneously perform aircraft tracking, wind profiling, and weather surveillance as a multi-function phased-array radar (MPAR). The advanced capabilities of the NWRT could lead to better warnings of severe weather.

== Directors ==
The following persons served as director of the NOAA National Severe Storms Laboratory:

No.	Image	Director	Term start	Term end	Refs
1		Edwin Kessler	1964	1986	
2		Robert Maddox	1986	1996	
3		Jeff Kimpel	1997	December 2010	
4		Steven Koch	April 2011	2019	
acting		Kurt Hondl	February 2019	March 2020	
5		John S. Kain	13 April 2020	2022	
acting		Kurt Hondl	April 2022	28 January 2023	
6		DaNa Carlis	29 January 2023	present	

== See also ==
- Canadian Severe Storms Laboratory (CSSL)
- European Severe Storms Laboratory (ESSL)
- NEXRAD Radar Operations Center (ROC)
- Storm chasing
- Weather forecasting
- Weather radar
