= List of University of Oklahoma buildings =

This list of University of Oklahoma buildings catalogs the structures on the campus of the University of Oklahoma in Norman, Oklahoma. Buildings are categorized based on their current functions and locations.

== Main campus ==
=== Academic facilities ===
Building	Image	Constructed	Notes	Reference
Adams Hall		1936	Historic Price College of Business building that is connected to the much more modern Price Hall.	
Bizzell Memorial Library		1929	OU's central library, it holds over 4.2 million volumes. In 2001 the building was listed as a National Historic Landmark for its role in the segregation case McLaurin v. Oklahoma State Regents for Higher Education.	
Burton Hall		1952	Department of Communication. Formerly the department of Home Economics	
Carnegie Building		1904	Originally built as a Carnegie Library, it now houses the department of Classics and Letters	
Carpenter Hall		1919	Contains studio and office space for the School of Musical Theater and several piano practice rooms	
Carson Engineering Center		1966	Houses the office of the College of Engineering's dean and the departments of industrial engineering and civil engineering	
Catlett Music Center		1986	Contains School of Music offices and practice rooms, a 1,000-seat concert hall, and an indoor rehearsal area for the Pride of Oklahoma	
Chemistry Building		1915	This facility was first named DeBarr Chemistry Hall, honoring one of the four original faculty members at OU, Edwin DeBarr. However, DeBarr's extensive involvement with the Ku Klux Klan, which came to light in the late 1980s, lead to a movement to strip his name from the building. It is today known as simply the Chemistry Building. This facility continues to house some offices and lab space for the department of Chemistry even with the completion of the Stephenson Life Sciences Research Center Building.	
Coats Hall		1999	This building is the home of the College of Law. In October 1999, ground was broken on a $19 million construction and renovation project which ultimately added 80,000 square feet to the facility, featuring the 58,000 square foot Donald E. Pray Law Library and the 250-seat Dick Bell Courtroom.	
Collings Hall		1952	Home of the College of Education, the building is currently undergoing a $9.5 million renovation and expansion	
Copeland Hall		1958	Houses OU Student Media, including the offices of the Oklahoma Daily and KGOU, OU's NPR affiliate station	
Cross Hall		1965	This building is the home of the Departments of Botany and Microbiology. It is named for George Lynn Cross, the longest serving OU president, whose academic background was in botany. It was the last of the many new buildings constructed during Cross's presidency.	
Dale Hall				
Dale Hall Tower				
Devon Energy Hall		2009	This 100,000-square-foot (9,300 m^{2}) facility is used by the College of Engineering, especially the Schools of Computer Science and Electrical Engineering.	
Engineering Laboratory		1910	This was the first building erected for the College of Engineering, which was founded that same year. It has been greatly expanded in the years since its construction, and currently houses the Schools of Electrical, Computer and Environmental Engineering and the School of Computer Science. The basement and parts of the first floor house OU's Information technology department.	
ExxonMobil Lawrence Rawl Engineering Practice Facility		2009	This building will gives various OU Engineering groups space to design, build and test projects. It will also be used by seniors who are working on their capstone project.	
Farzaneh Hall (formerly Hester Hall)		1925	Built as a female dormitory, it now houses the Department of Economics, the School of International and Area Studies and the International Programs Center	
Felgar Hall		1925	This historic building contains many of the College of Engineering's administrative offices, as well as the engineering library and the departments of mechanical and aerospace engineering	
Fred Jones Jr. Art Center		1971	Constructed at the same time as the adjacent Fred Jones Jr. Museum of Art, this building provides studio and office space for the School of Art.	
Gaylord Hall		2005, 2009	The new home for the College of Journalism, Gaylord Hall was built in two phases. It is named for Oklahoma journalism giant Edward K. Gaylord.	
Gittinger Hall		1952	Offices and classroom space for the Department of English; demolished for the construction of Lin Hall.	
Gould Hall		1951	Formerly used for School of Petroleum Engineering, the newly renovated Gould Hall, which was dedicated in the Fall of 2011, houses the College of Architecture.	
Kaufman Hall		1949	Home to the Department of Modern Languages and Linguistics	
Lin Hall		2018	Newest building on campus, on the site of the former Gittinger Hall, Lin Hall opened in 2018 to provide the Homer L. Dodge Department of Physics and Astronomy will new lab spaces.	
Nielsen Hall		1946	Department of Physics classrooms, faculty offices space, and labs	
Observatory		1938	Contains a 0.4 meter Meade SCT telescope	
Old Science Hall		1904	Home to OU's Center for Teaching Excellence, Institutional Research & Reporting, Helmerich School of Drama main offices and two performance spaces, and classrooms for the Department of Film and Video Studies, this is OU's oldest building	
Physical Science Center		1971	This building houses the departments of math and history of science, as well as numerous classrooms of all sizes, it has been dubbed by OU students as "The Blender"	
Price Hall		2005	Built as an expansion to historic Adams Hall, the building doubled the space for the College of Business	
Richards Hall		1935	Build as a WPA project, this building houses the department of Biology and the advising offices for pre-med students	
Sarkeys Energy Center		1990	Dedicated to research of energy related topics, this building contains six interdisciplinary institutes with members from four of OU's colleges. It is also the home of the Mewbourne College of Earth and Energy and the School of Chemical, Biological, and Materials Engineering.	
Zarrow Hall		2011	The new home for the OU School of Social Work. It was built on the demolished site of the original Tri-Delta Sorority House, later the Jim Thorpe Multicultural Center.	

=== Administrative facilities ===
Building	Image	Constructed	Notes	Reference
Buchanan Hall		1926	The building houses the office of the Bursar, as well as the records and admissions.	
Ellison Hall		1928	Originally built to house the on-campus hospital, Ellison Hall was renovated in 2002 to become the administrative building for the College of Arts and Sciences, OU's largest college.	
Evans Hall		1912	This is the university's central administrative building, containing the offices of the President and provost, as well as several vice presidents. It was the third administration building to be constructed, the first two having been destroyed by fire.	
Wagner Hall		2008	This building was built in 2008 to house many of OU's student academic services. It contains the offices of the University College, graduation offices, tutoring services, a writing center, several classrooms and small group study rooms.	
Whitehand Hall		1920	This administrative building was once a Masonic dormitory, built with a $300,000 donation from the Masonic Charity Foundation of Oklahoma.	

=== Athletic facilities ===
Building	Image	Opened	Notes	Reference
Barry Switzer Center		1999	Located at the south end of the Gaylord Family Oklahoma Memorial Stadium, the Switzer Center houses football offices, the football locker room, equipment room, the Siegfried Strength and Conditioning Complex, the Freede Sports Medicine Facility and the Touchdown Club Legends Lobby. The Anderson All-American Plaza, located just outside the Switzer Center, features a large wall honoring every OU All-American. The name of every letter winner from each OU sport is also displayed.	
Gaylord Family Oklahoma Memorial Stadium		1925	This venue is the on-campus football facility for the OU Sooners. The official capacity of the stadium following recent renovations is 82,112, making it the fourteenth largest college stadium in the United States.	
L. Dale Mitchell Baseball Park		1982	The home of the Sooners baseball team, this field was renovated in 1992 to include additional seating and locker room space.	
Lloyd Noble Center		1975	This building houses an 11,528-seat multi-purpose arena. It is home to the Oklahoma Sooners men's and women's basketball teams.	
McCasland Field House		1928	Originally the home to Sooner basketball, this facility now is used by the OU wrestling, volleyball, and men's gymnastics teams.	

=== Museums ===
Building	Image	Constructed	Notes	Reference
Fred Jones Jr. Museum of Art		1971, 2005	Housing works by artists like Edgar Degas, Claude Monet, Mary Cassatt, Vincent van Gogh, Camille Pissarro, and Pierre-Auguste Renoir, this museum is one of the largest at a college in the United States. Originally constructed in 1971, a new wing was added in 2005.	
Sam Noble Oklahoma Museum of Natural History		2000	A university-operated natural history museum, it including a Native American gallery and collections of fossils and dinosaur skeletons from Oklahoma and throughout the world.	

=== Residential facilities ===
Building	Image	Constructed/Duration	Notes	Reference
Adams Center		1964-2023	Adams Center was a university residence hall made up of four residential towers: Tarman, Muldrow, McCasland, and Johnson. It was officially named in 1965 for K.S. "Boots" Adams, a former chairman and chief executive officer of the Phillips Petroleum Company. Adams and the company made one of the first large private gifts to the university during the administration of President George Lynn Cross. The tower was fully demolished, with the last basement remnants on the southwest branch on September 1, 2023.	
Boyd House		1906	The house of David Ross Boyd, OU's first president, this building remains the official residence of the president of the university, currently Joseph Harroz. It is listed on the National Register of Historic Places.	
Couch Center		1966-present		
Walker Center		1966-2026	Originally named Couch North, it changed its name to Walker Center in 1970.	
Cross Village		Opened 2018		

=== Other facilities ===
Building	Image	Constructed	Notes	Reference
Asp Avenue Parking Facility		2005	The main parking facility for commuter students, its first floor and basement house the OU Bookstore.	
Jacobson Hall		1919	First built as a library and then used to house the OU art museum, this building is now the official OU visitors center.	
Holmberg Hall (Reynolds Performing Arts Center)		1918	A European style opera hall, it was renamed in 2005 following an extensive renovation.	
Monnet Hall		1914	Built as the home for the College of Law, Monnet Hall now houses the OU Library's Western History Collection.	
Oklahoma Memorial Union		1928	The OU student union, it houses a variety of restaurants, office space for the student government and various student organizations, a ballroom, a movie theater, a credit union, and a variety of other student amenities. It is also the home to the OU Department of Student Life.	

== Research campus facilities ==
Building	Image	Constructed	Notes	Reference
National Weather Center		2006	This 224,000-square-foot (20,800 m^{2}) facility houses a confederation of federal, state, and academic organizations that work together to improve understanding of events occurring in Earth's atmosphere over a wide range of time and space scales. It accommodates OU's academic and research programs in meteorology and the National Oceanic and Atmospheric Administration's Norman-based weather research and operations programs, including the National Severe Storms Laboratory and the National Weather Service Forecast Office.	
One Partners Place		2004	One Partners Place houses the private company Weathernews Americas, the largest publicly traded private weather company in the world, as well as the office of the OU Integrated Robust Data Services. The second floor of the facility, completed in February 2007, houses the university's radar innovations lab and an academic outreach office.	
OU-PRIME Radar		2009	OU-PRIME (Polarimetric Radar for Innovations in Meteorology and Engineering) is an advanced Doppler weather radar. It has the highest resolution of any C-band, polarimetric, research, weather radar in the United States.	
Stephenson Life Sciences Research Center		2010	This project provided the university's Department of Chemistry and Biochemistry with new teaching and research laboratory space, as well as graduate seminar areas, conference rooms, and a lecture hall.	
Stephenson Research and Technology Center		2004	The first component of what will be a multi-phase research complex, this structure is home to several interdisciplinary programs in microbiology, botany, and bioengineering, as well as the OU Supercomputing Center.	
Three Partners Place		2009	The facility houses the offices of three University Vice Presidents– Vice President for Technology Development, the University Research Cabinet, and the Vice President for Research as well as the Office of Research Services, the Center for the Creation of Economic Wealth, Intellectual Property Management Office, Commerce and Investment Venture Opportunities, and the Office of Export Controls. It is also home to several private companies, including Dow Lohnes and RiskMetrics Group.	
Two Partners Place		2007	This facility houses the university's Center for Applied Social Research, K20 Center for Educational and Community Renewal, and Center for Spatial Analysis as well as the private company Atmospheric Technology Services Company Inc.	

== Planned facilities ==
Building	Began	Est. Completion	Notes	Reference
Five Partners Place	TBD	TBD	OU Regents approved plans for a fifth multidisciplinary research facility in July 2010.	
Four Partners Place	2010	2012	Plans call for this facility to house Nanjing Automobile Group Corp.’s MG subsidiary research and development facility.	
McCasland Hall	August 2023	Fall 2025/Fall 2026	Freshman residence hall to replace Adams Center. One half will open in Fall 2025, the other in Fall 2026.	

== Historic campus photographs ==
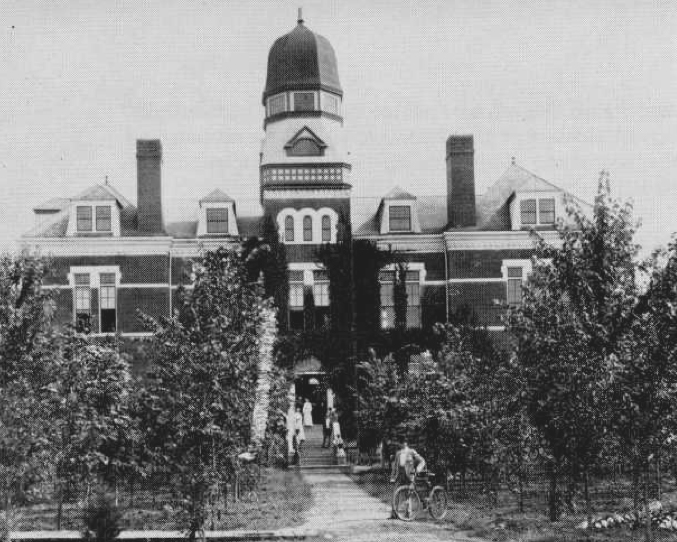
The first building on the OU campus, which burned down in 1903

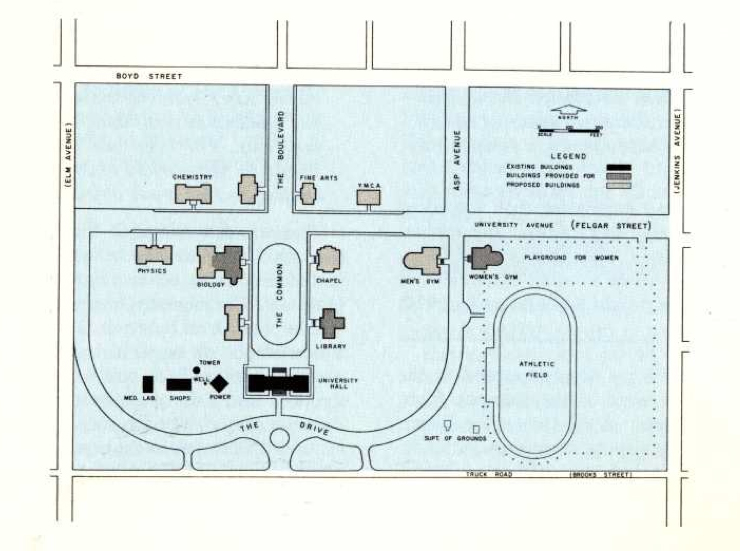
The plans for what is today the North Oval, as first proposed by Prof. V.L. Parrington in 1903

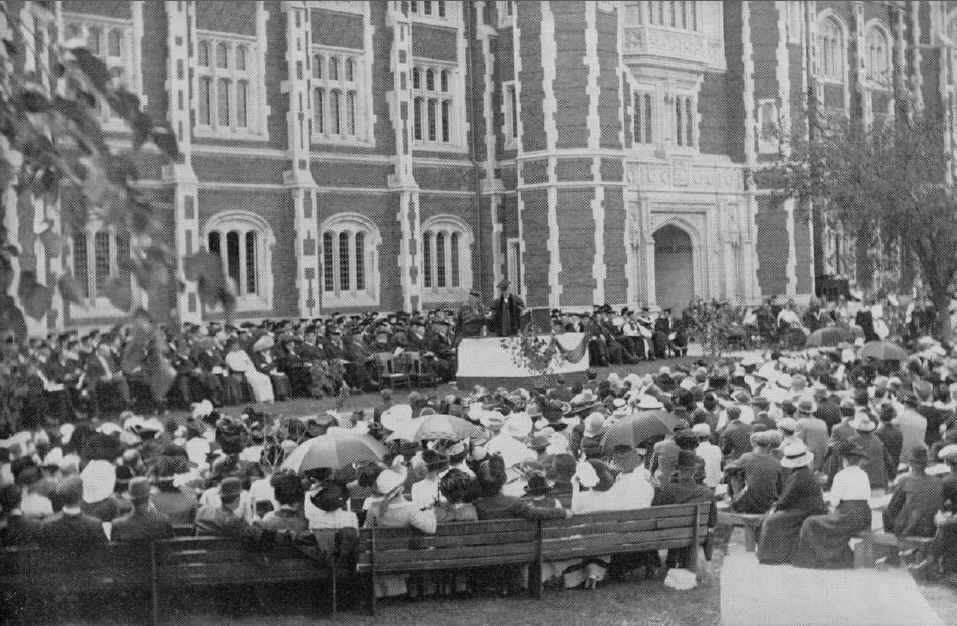
Inauguration of OU President Brooks in front of Evans Hall, 1912

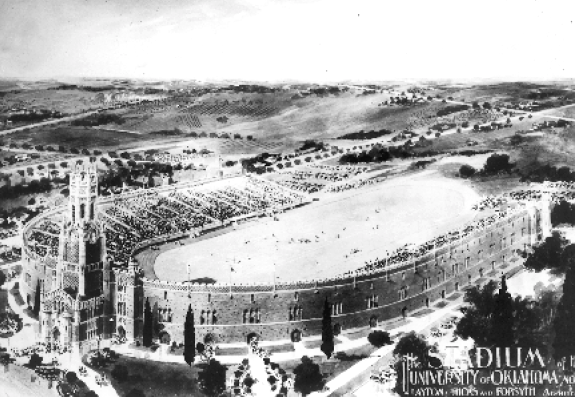
Early sketch of the Oklahoma Memorial Stadium

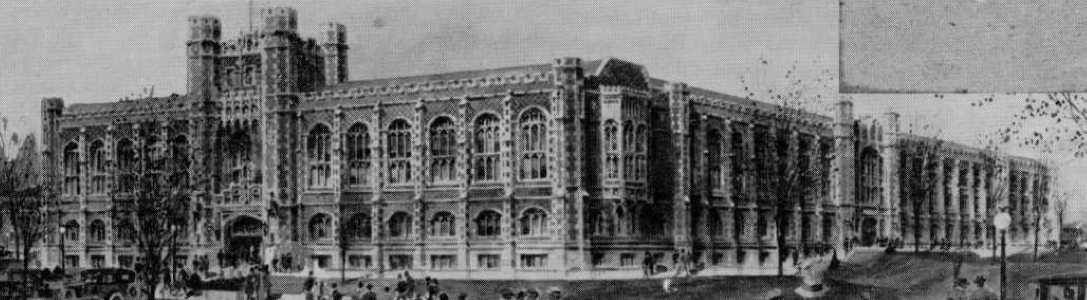
Original Plans for the Bizzell Memorial Library, which showed the building connected to nearby Evans Hall

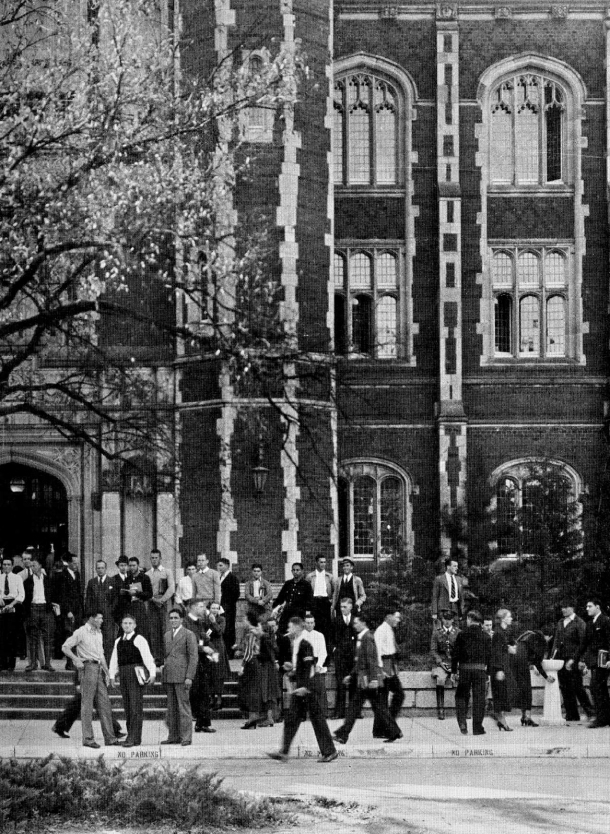
Bizzell Memorial Library as seen in 1935

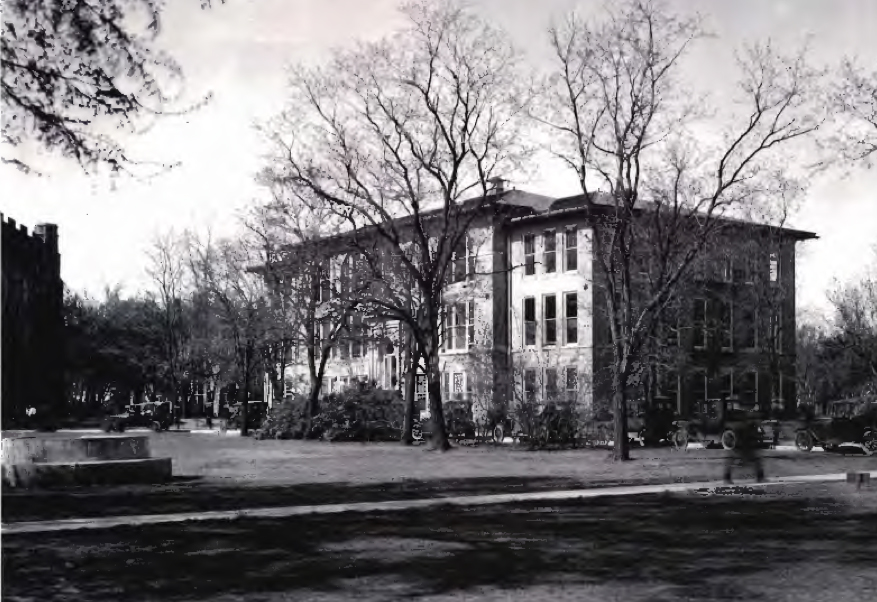
Old Science Hall, the oldest building on the OU campus, as seen in a 1920 photograph
