= Sarkeys Energy Center =

Coordinates: 35.2107°N 97.4404°W

Sarkeys Energy Center is the largest and tallest building on the campus of the University of Oklahoma (OU), Norman, Oklahoma, United States. It houses several academic units mainly centered on the Earth sciences.

== Overview ==
The Sarkeys Energy Center is a large complex that is home to several academic units of the University of Oklahoma including the Mewbourne College of Earth and Energy (MCEE), the College of Atmospheric and Geographic Sciences (A&GS), and Chemical, Biological and Materials Engineering (COE). The Energy Center is currently owned and occupied by the University of Oklahoma.

== Details of the Tower and Complex ==
Construction of the Energy Center was begun on November 16, 1990, and was completed by the dedication in late 1991. Funds granted by petroleum companies for use by the University of Oklahoma, loans by federal United States government, and donations by charitable individuals were all used to finance the 50 million dollar project. The Sarkeys Energy Center Complex occupies over 7 acres (28,000 m^{2}) on the University of Oklahoma's Norman campus. The complex has 340,000 square feet (32,000 m^{2}) of office space, a cafe, and two large levels of laboratories and storage rooms. The ground level, level 2, is home to the Laurence S. Youngblood Energy Library. The library has approximately 170,000 map sheets, and 100,000 cataloged volumes covering a variety of geoscience topics. The tower of the Sarkeys Energy Center is 15 floors tall, and is used for most of the office space in the complex. The roof of the tower marks the highest spot on the OU campus 63.6 m (209 ft), and is also the tallest office building in the city of Norman. The complex contains walks, fountains, and extensive landscaping.

Sarkeys Energy Center as it is known today, began as the Saxon Energy Center. This was made possible by a pledge of a $30M donation made in 1981 by Bill D. Saxon. O.U. wound up receiving 90,000 shares in lieu of the donation toward the energy center. Because of the need for completion funds, Sarkeys Foundation provided the bulk of the construction funding.

== Role of Center in Geophysics ==
The Sarkeys Energy Center is host to many conferences, talks, and meetings among leading geophysicists. The complex includes an auditorium for speeches and talks. On May 21, 2002, the University of Oklahoma was named International Academic Advocate of the Year because of its foreign policy conferences. The Energy Center remains an important center for research, education, and conference in the world of geophysical science.

The internationally recognized School of Meteorology within the College of Atmospheric and Geographic Sciences was located in Sarkeys until relocating to the National Weather Center (NWC).
