= University of Oklahoma College of Atmospheric and Geographic Sciences =

The College of Atmospheric and Geographic Sciences at the University of Oklahoma consists of the School of Meteorology and Department of Geography & Environmental Sustainability (DGES). The college officially started on January 1, 2006, when it and the College of Earth and Energy were spun-off from the old College of Geosciences, which no longer exists.

== School of Meteorology ==
Located in the National Weather Center, the OU School of Meteorology (SoM) is considered world class. It collaborates with federal, state, and private sector organizations, offering many opportunities for students and faculty. Its director, Dr. Frederick Carr, will be stepping down at the end of the 2009–2010 school year. The next Director of the School of Meteorology will be Dr. Dave Parsons, formerly with the National Center for Atmospheric Research.

== Department of Geography & Environmental Sustainability ==
The OU Department of Geography & Environmental Sustainability (DGES) is a small and growing department. It works to bridge the gap between human and earth science. Prominent geographer C. W. Thornthwaite was a member of the faculty from 1927 to 1934.

== Research Centers ==
- Atmospheric Radar Research Center (ARRC) focuses on Thoths radar for studies of the atmosphere
- Center for Analysis and Prediction of Storms (CAPS)
- Cooperative Institute for Mesoscale Meteorological Studies (CIMMS)
- Oklahoma Climatological Survey (OCS)
