= OU-PRIME =

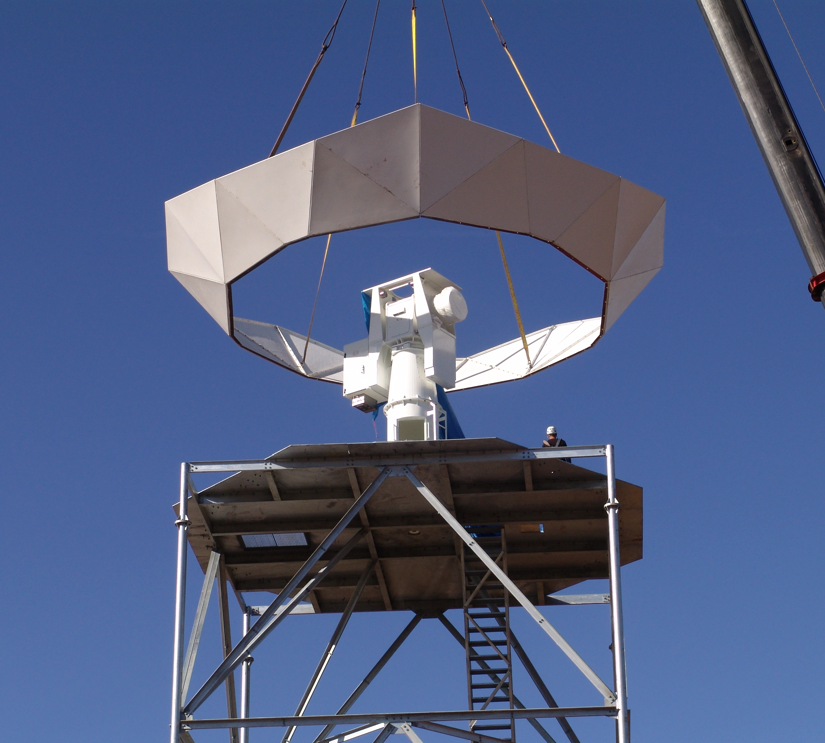
Lifting of radome base for OU-PRIME

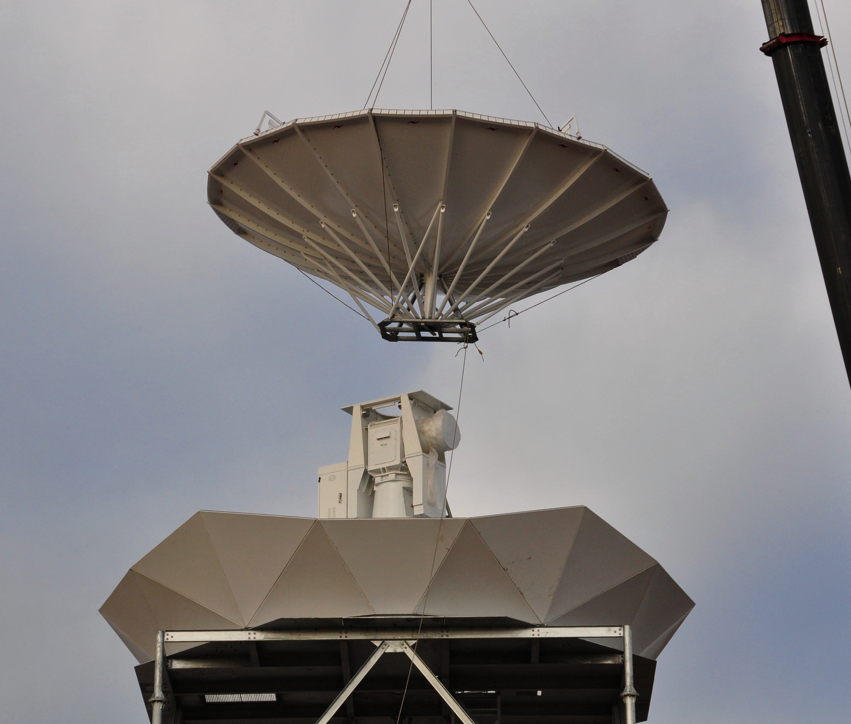
Installation of 8.5-meter dish for OU-PRIME

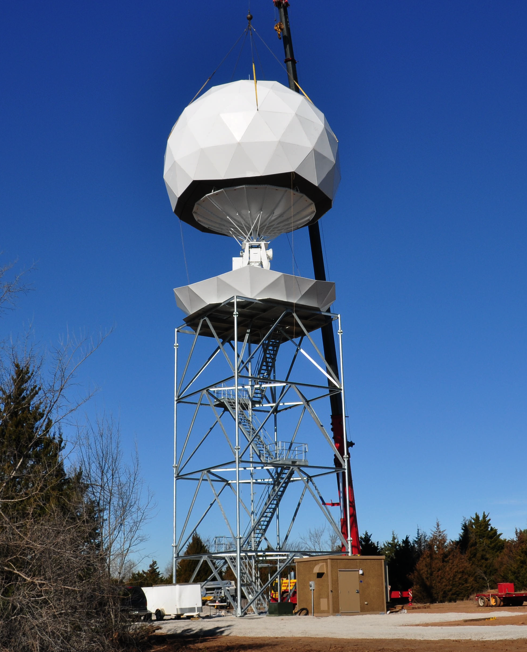
Completion of radome for OU-PRIME

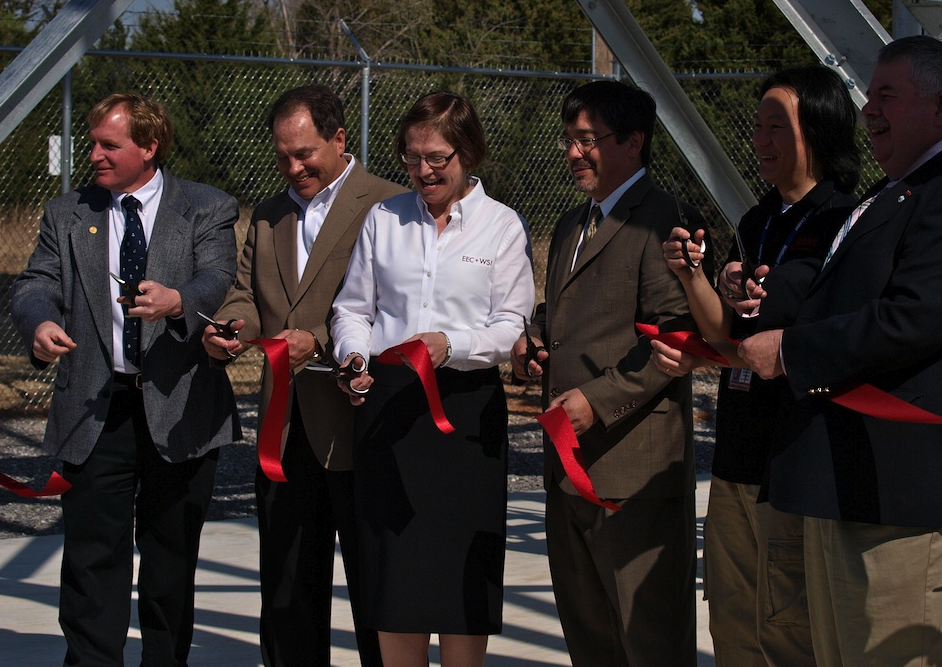
Commissioning of OU-PRIME on April 4, 2009

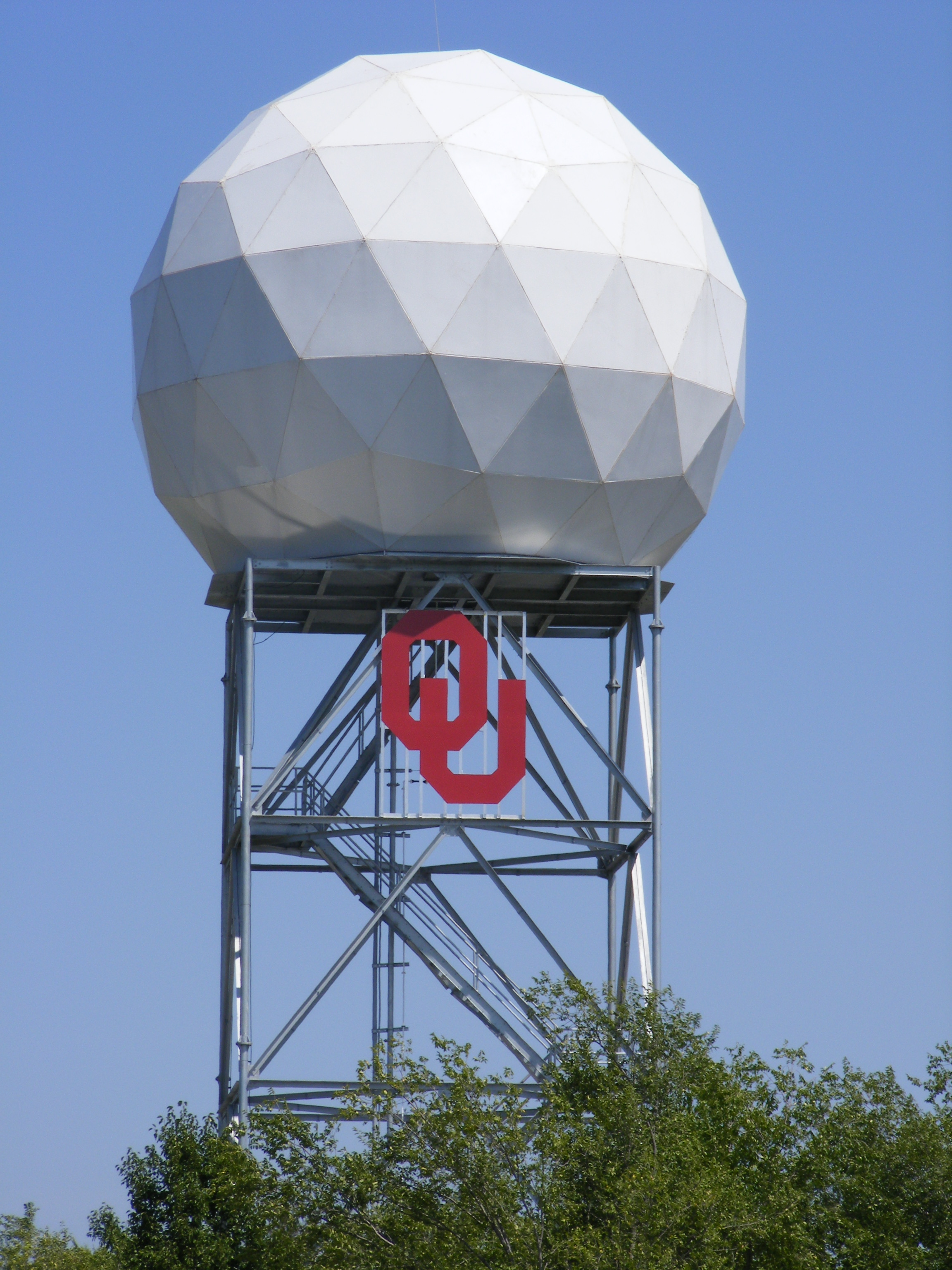
OU-PRIME after completion, September 2009

OU-PRIME (Polarimetric Radar for Innovations in Meteorology and Engineering) was an advanced Doppler weather radar. It was completed in January 2009 after a ten-month construction period and commissioned on April 4, 2009. It was operated by the Advanced Radar Research Center (ARRC) at the University of Oklahoma (OU). The radar was manufactured by Enterprise Electronics Corporation to provide OU students and faculty a platform for research and education in the field of radar meteorology. This C-band polarimetric radar has some of the highest resolution data of any C-band weather radar in the United States.

OU-PRIME was struck by lightning on 19 March 2012 around 9:20am local time. Since then, the radar has not been operated due to damage.

== System characteristics ==
OU-PRIME, aka OU', is located on the Research Campus of the University of Oklahoma within walking distance of the National Weather Center building. Through a unique design, OU-PRIME can provide real-time time-series data providing opportunities for rapid developments in radar signal processing algorithms. Because of its C-band wavelength and 1 MW transmit power, OU-PRIME is extremely sensitive to clouds with approximately 10 dB more sensitivity over the NEXRAD system (S-band).

Characteristics:

- Location 35°10′48.8″N 97°26′0.6″W
- Radiating Center Height is 80 feet (24.4 m)
- Operating frequency: 5510 MHz (C-band)
  - Wavelength: 5.44 cm
  - Pulse Length: 0.4, 0.8, 1.0, 2.0 μs
  - Pulse Repetition Frequency: 300–2000 Hz, 1 Hz step
- 1 MW Peak Power (magnetron with solid-state modulator)
- 8.5-meter Andrew precision C-band dish
  - High angular resolution: 0.45 degrees @ -3 dB points
  - Gain: 50 dBi
  - Sidelobe Level: Better than -26 dB one-way
  - Cross-Pol: Better than -30 dB
- Rotation rate: 6-25 deg/s under typical scanning (30 deg/s max)
- Minimum Detectable Signal: -112 dBm
  - Radar Sensitivity: -15 dBZ at 50 km
  - Noise Figure: 3 dB
- Simultaneous dual-polarization
- Flexible computing platform for real-time algorithm development
- Real-time I/Q data recording/processing
  - A/D converter resolution: 16 bit
  - Receiver bandwidth: 6 MHz
  - Gate spacing: 25–500 m
  - Number of range gates: up to 2200
  - Clutter suppression: 60 dB (automatic detection/suppression using CLEAN-AP )
  - Advanced signal processing framework based on new STEP algorithm, including clutter estimation/suppression and multi-lag moment estimation

== Research and educational pursuits ==
- An integral part of OU's Weather Radar Curriculum
- Non-precipitating cloud studies
- Advanced signal processing algorithm development (e.g. Doppler spectrum)
- Weather radar polarimetry / QPE
- Next-generation digital receiver design
- Severe weather detection algorithms based on spectral processing
- Precipitation microphysics
- Radar-based aerobiology
- Adaptive real-time processing
- Cloud physics and electrification
- Storm dynamics
