= Horus (radar) =

Digital phased array radar used for weather observation

- Country of origin: United States
- Manufacturer: OU Advanced Radar Research Center, National Severe Storms Laboratory
- Designer: Robert Palmer (Project Lead); Redmond Kelley; Matt McCord; John Meier
- Introduced: 2022
- No. built: 1
- Type: Fully Digital Polarimetric Phased Array Weather Radar
- Frequency: 2.7–3.1 GHz (S-band)
- RPM: 12
- Azimuth: 360º
- Elevation: −1–92º
- Power: 32 kW (150 kW generator)

Horus is a truck mounted, digital polarimetric phased array radar designed and operated by the University of Oklahoma's Advanced Radar Research Center in collaboration with the National Severe Storms Laboratory. Unlike other mobile phased array research radars including the Rapid-Scan DOW, MWR-05XP, and Atmospheric Imaging Radar (AIR), Horus is the first to utilize a fully digital phased array architecture and one of the first to have dual polarization. This makes Horus the most advanced research radar in the world. The radar is named after the Egyptian god of the sky Horus, whose eye is featured on the side of the vehicle.

== History and deployment ==
The Advanced Radar Research Center began work on developing phased array radars for weather research in the mid-2000s, with a detailed plan for the Atmospheric Imaging Radar (AIR) presented at the 33rd Conference on Radar Meteorology in 2007. By 2011, the AIR was completed and had its first operational test on August 8. AIR utilized a single polarization, fixed imaging subarray beamformer architecture, which offered low costs at the expense of having a fixed “fan” transmitting beam.

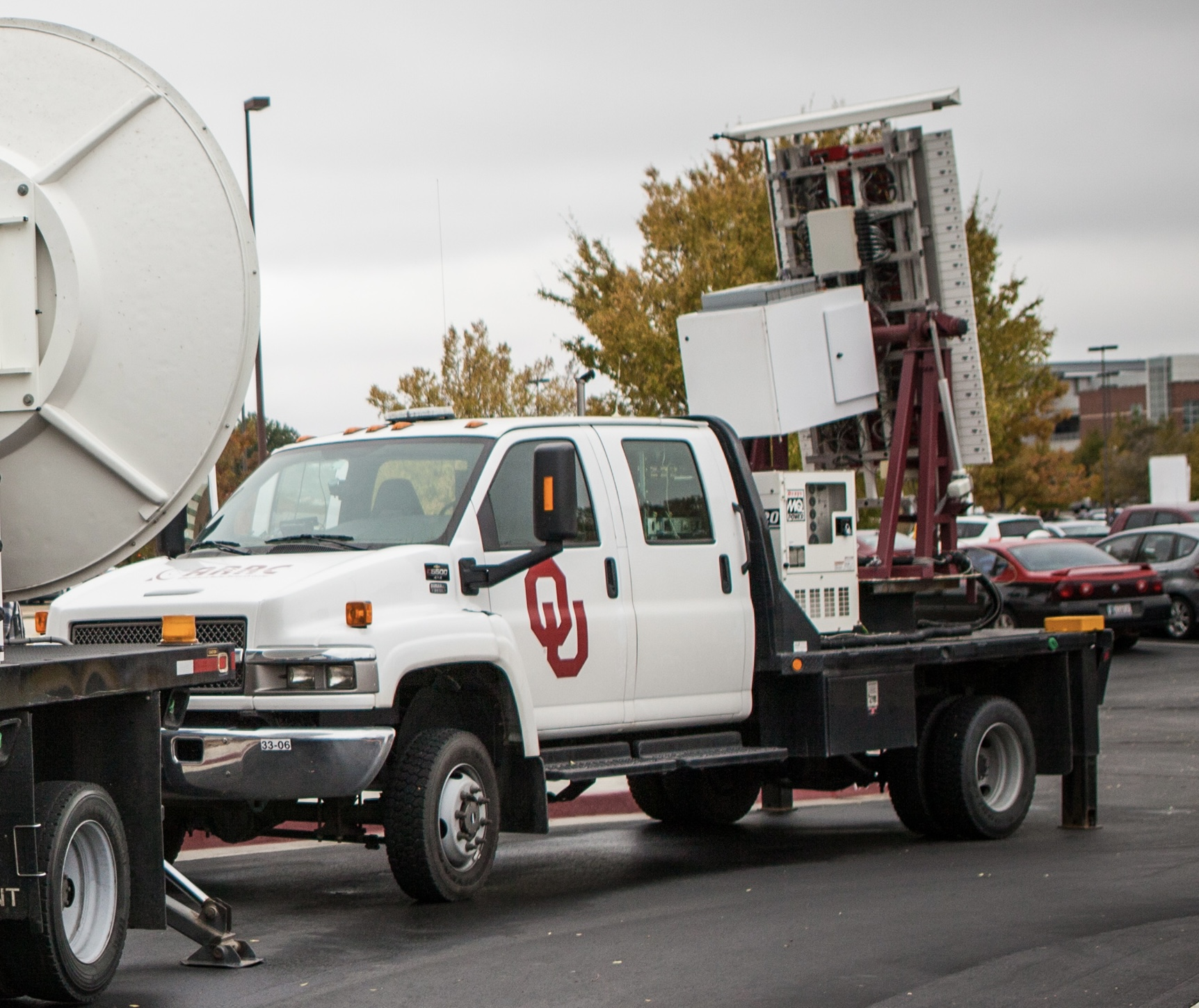
Atmospheric Imaging Radar (AIR)

Shortly after completion of the AIR mobile radar, the Advanced Radar Research Center began work on developing new and more advanced phased array systems. These efforts culminated in the Cylindrical Polarimetric Phased Array Radar (CPPAR) and Horus, with other projects like the Parabolic Atmospheric Imaging Radar (PAIR) and Ka-band Mobile Rapid-Scanning Volumetric Imaging Radar (KaRVIR) still in development. Work on Horus began in the early 2010s with funding from NOAA, the Office of Naval Research, and the Army Research Laboratory. By 2018, the Advanced Radar Research Center had won over $15.2 million in government grants specifically related to the Horus project, with $6.4 million coming from NOAA and $8.8 million coming from the ONR and ARL.

The first prototype was tested in 2019 and after several more years of development, Horus was completed in fall 2022. By December 2022, Horus became the first ever fully digital phased array radar to collect meteorological data. Because Horus is software limited rather than hardware limited, it has received continuous updates and development since its initial launch including the recalibration of existing scan modes and addition of new scan modes in early 2025. Horus has scanned a variety of meteorological phenomenon including lightning streaks, which were previously unobservable using traditional parabolic radars. During a severe weather event on May 11, 2023, Horus was able to conduct 582 radar scans containing lightning echoes over the period of 1 hour. These scans included rare lightning observations of positive channels propagating through negatively charged layers, which are notoriously difficult for lightning mapping arrays to detect. On April 27, 2024, Horus scanned its first tornadic circulation, a short lived QLCS tornado, during the tornado outbreak of April 25–28, 2024. On June 3, 2025, Horus scanned an EF-1 tornado moving southeast from Newcastle, Oklahoma to Norman, Oklahoma. Starting in 2026, Horus will take part in a 3-year research project called Phased Array Polarimetry for Electrification and Lightning (PAPEL), which aims to study lightning by combining the rapid scanning technology of Horus and RaXPol with the Oklahoma Lightning Mapping Array, electric field-change sensors and video observations.

== Specifications ==
Horus utilizes a planar two-dimensional (2D) fully digital polarimetric phased array radar (PPPAR) made of 25 panels consisting of 1600 individual elements. Each element is digitized and combined to form either one or multiple beams which are steered by software, allowing for Horus to quickly change its scanning mode without the requirement of physically altering the radar architecture. This also means that Horus doesn't use hardware based phase shifters and attenuators, meaning Horus is software defined and can be reconfigured and upgraded with changes to software. Horus's software is made of four primary layers, consisting of deterministic radar signal processing and control done in field programmable gate arrays (FPGAs), embedded software controlling the sub-panel architecture, back-end data processing on servers, and the operator interface running on computers. In early 2025, Horus was recalibrated after offsets between copolar H/V beams were found, resulting in new offsets of <0.1°, which is 1/30th of the beamwidth. Following the successful recalibration, new improvements are being tested, including mitigating clutter from wind turbines, improving clutter filtering, and new advanced waveform concepts.

Horus Radar Specifications
Frequency	2.7–3.1 GHz
Polarization	ATSR, STSR, RHCP, LHCP
Tx Waveform	Arbitrary Waveform Generator
Tx Peak Power (single element)	10 W per polarization
Tx Peak Power (Total)	32 kW
Max Tx Pulse Width	100 μs @ 10% duty cycle
Max Tx Bandwidth	100 MHz
Element Spacing	0.5 λ @ 2.951 GHz
Number of Panels	25 (1600 elements)
Max Electronic Scan Angle	±45° az, ±45° el
Aperture Size	2.03 x 2.03 m^{2}
Tx/Rx Beamwidth Broadside	2.58° (no taper)
Detectability (1 pulse)	9.9 dBZ @ 50 km

Horus operates in S-band, a mid-band frequency range which offers greater range and suffers from significantly less attenuation than X-band and C-band at the cost of lower resolution. However, S-band radars are still capable of producing resolutions high enough for detailed meteorological analysis, but this typically requires long antennas to compensate, which can be seen with NEXRAD and WSR-74-S. For phased array radars, which use radiative elements rather than parabolic antennas, beamwidth and resolution are dependent on the total number of radiating elements and the power provided to them. Due to Horus's size and having only 1600 radiating elements, its resolution and beamwidth is significantly lower than NEXRAD, producing a beamwidth of 3.1° compared to NEXRAD's 0.95°. Coupled with Horus being a 10 cm wavelength radar, the overall resolution it produces is far lower than many other meteorological radars, including other S-band models. Even with these limitations, the current iteration of Horus is still able to function as a capable meteorologic radar and make useful scientific observations. Future iterations of Horus which are ground based will be able to achieve a much higher resolution, as the number of panels and radiative elements installed will not be limited by the confines of being mounted on a truck.

Depending on the scan mode used, Horus can conduct small sector scans in as little as 2–4 seconds and can conduct more traditional PPI and RHI scans in 60–90 seconds. These scans are significantly faster than traditional mechanically scanned parabolic radars, with NEXRAD taking 5 – 10 minutes to complete a 360° Volume Coverage Pattern (VCP). These rapid scans allow for Horus to observe fast changes in storm structure, which is particularly useful for understanding tornadogenesis and small timescale atmospheric occurrences. To calibrate its radar in the field, Horus utilizes a drone equipped with a metal sphere and Tx/Rx receivers. This allows for Horus to recalibrate in each unique atmospheric environment and topography, avoiding potential inaccuracies which occur from traditional calibration methods.

== Scan modes ==
Horus's fully digital architecture allows it to conduct a wide variety traditional and advanced scan modes unavailable to traditional parabolic antennas and even other phased array systems.

=== Traditional weather radar scan modes ===
- Plan position indicator (PPI) scans: Radar beam is electronically swept horizontally for 90° at a fixed elevation and without mechanical radar rotation. This creates a 2 dimensional radar scan, but the radar beam can be swept at multiple elevations to create a 3 dimensional volume scan. Horus can create a 3 dimensional scan at an elevation range of 0°– 20° with 90° of azimuth in a time period of 60–90 seconds, which is significantly shorter than traditional radars.
- Range-height Indicator (RHI) scans: Radar beam is electronically swept vertically at a fixed azimuth and no mechanical radar rotation. This creates a 2 dimensional vertical cross section of the storm structure, but the radar beam can be swept vertically at multiple azimuths to create a 3 dimensional volume scan. Similar to PPI scans, a 3 dimensional volume scan takes between 60 and 90 seconds. This method can limit temporal resolution.

=== Multiple transmit beams ===
- Simultaneous transmit beams: Radar creates several simultaneous beams in multiple directions. This allows for Horus to scan multiple elevations or azimuths at the same time and allows for rapid radar updates at low elevations, which can assist with clarifying strong reflectivity gradients and rapidly changing environments like the mesocyclone during tornadogenesis. However, transmitting multiple beams simultaneously requires Horus to divide power between the amount of radar beams emitted, degrading the gain and minimum detectable signal in comparison to a single beam scan conducted with traditional scan modes. This degradation means that Horus typically transmits only 3–7 beams at a time. When using the simultaneous transmit beam mode, it is typically paired with mechanical rotation of the radar, allowing for a high resolution 360° scan at 20° elevation in only 90 seconds.
- Quasi-simultaneous transmit beams: Radar creates several beams that change direction from pulse to pulse, with the pointing direction separated by approximately one pulse width. The advantage of this mode is that it reduces mainlobe to sidelobe contamination across sharp gradients while also preserving full aperture gain. However, it has the downside of decreasing the pulse length per steering direction in proportion to the number of beams transmitted, reducing echo detectability.

=== Radar imaging ===
- One-dimensional spoiling: Transmit beam is broadened so that it is wider than a traditional pencil beam. For 1D spoiling, the radar rotates to provide a 360° scan over 20° in elevation. This creates much faster updates at the cost of angular resolution, being able to create full scans in only 10–30 seconds. This is particularly useful for documenting rapid storm evolution and collecting dense vertical sampling.
- Two-dimensional spoiling: Transmit beam is broadened in both azimuth and elevation to be larger than traditional pencil beams. This is typically conducted in areas of (5° x 5°) or (10° x 10°) and used to obtain azimuth coverage of 90° in only 2–4 seconds without using mechanical radar rotation,. This allows for extremely fast updates in specific areas of interest like the mesocyclone of a supercell, collecting high temporal resolution data. However, the broadened beam comes with the downside of reduced precipitation detectability and angular resolution.

=== Summary of scan modes ===
Summary of Horus scanning configurations
Scan mode	Beam control	Azimuth coverage	Elevation coverage	Mechanical rotation	Update time (s)	Potential use case
Pencil-beam PPI/RHI	Single narrow beam	90°	0°– 20°	No	60–90	Baseline scans with angular resolution and high sensitivity
1D spoiled (elevation)	Phase-only broadened beam	360°	20°	Yes	10–30	Rapid storm evolution requiring dense vertical sampling
2D spoiled	Dual-axis beam broadening	90°	20°	No	2–4	Extremely fast updates for regions of interest like mesocyclones
Multiple simultaneous beams	3–7 concurrent beams	360°	20°	Yes	60–90	Fast low level coverage with high resolution

== Future application ==
Horus's radar was designed to serve as a testbed for cutting edge digital phased array technology and assess the potential applications of this technology in NOAA's NEXRAD replacement, called RADAR NEXT With this objective in mind, Horus's architecture was built to be modular and easily scalable, allowing for reduced beamwidth with the addition of more elements. While the current Horus mobile radar consists of 1600 elements within 25 panels, it typically only produces a beamwidth of 3.1° x 3.1°, which is much lower than other weather radars and limits its meteorological applications. However, by increasing the number of elements to 10,000 over roughly 156 panels, a Horus radar would be able to achieve an angular resolution of ~1°, which is much more suitable for meteorological observation and is closer to the WSR88D's beamwidth of 0.95°. Horus is also being evaluated by the Office of Naval Research, with a proposed military variant of the radar dubbed “Horus-D”. The proposed military variant of Horus also operates in S-band and is stated to be extremely similar to the weather observation variant, but no further details are available to the public.

== See also ==
- Advanced Radar Research Center
- Phased array
- Digital antenna array
- Mobile radar observation of tornadoes
