= Berrien Moore =

American mathematician (1941–2024)

Berrien Moore III
- Born: November 12, 1941; Atlanta, Georgia, U.S.
- Died: December 17, 2024 (aged 83); Norman, Oklahoma, U.S.
- Known for: Founding director of Climate Central

Academic background
- Education: University of North Carolina; University of Virginia (PhD)
- Doctoral advisor: Uriel Weinreich

Academic work
- Discipline: Mathematics, earth sciences
- Institutions: University of Oklahoma; University of New Hampshire
- Notable works: Third Assessment Report of the Intergovernmental Panel on Climate Change

Berrien Moore III (November 12, 1941 – December 17, 2024) was an American mathematician and earth scientist who served as the director of the Institute for the Study of Earth, Oceans, and Space at the University of New Hampshire and the founding director of Climate Central.

Moore was born in Atlanta, Georgia in 1941 and earned his bachelor's degree from the University of North Carolina and a PhD in mathematics from the University of Virginia on 1969. In June 2010, he accepted a set of linked positions at the University of Oklahoma: Vice President, Weather & Climate Programs, Director, National Weather Center, and Dean, College of Atmospheric and Geographic Sciences. He held the Chesapeake Energy Corporation Chair in Climate Studies. Moore was a coordinating lead author of the final chapter of the Third Assessment Report of the Intergovernmental Panel on Climate Change (IPCC), an organisation that shared the 2007 Nobel Peace Prize. Among his other honors are the 2007 Dryden Lectureship in Research from the American Institute of Aeronautics and Astronautics and NASA Distinguished Public Service Medal. Moore held a Ph.D. in Mathematics from the University of Virginia.

Berrien Moore III died on December 17, 2024 in Norman, Oklahoma.

== Selected publications ==
- Cardoso, M. F., G. C. Hurtt, B. Moore, C. A. Nobre and H. Bain (2005), Field Work and Statistical Analyses for Enhanced Interpretation of Satellite Fire Data, Remote Sens. Env., 98, 212–227, doi:10.1016/j.rse.2005.02.008.
- Li, C., S. E. Frolking, X. Xiao, B. Moore, S. H. Boles, J. Qiu, Y. Huang, W. A. Salas and R. Sass (2005), Modeling Impacts of Farming Management Alternatives on CO_{2}, CH_{4} and N_{2}O Emissions: A Case Study for Water Management of Rice Agriculture of China, Global Biogeochem. Cycles, 19(3), doi:10.1029/2004GB002341.
- Moore, B (2002), Challenges of a Changing Earth. In: Steffen W, Jäger J, Carson D and Bradshaw C(eds) Challenges of a Changing Earth. Proceedings of the Global Change Open Science Conference, Amsterdam, NL, 10–13 July 2001. Springer-Verlag Berlin Heidelberg New York Tokyo.
- Xiao, X., B. Moore, X. Qin, Z. Shen and S. H. Boles (2002), Large-scale observation of alpine snow and ice cover in Asia: using multi-temporal VEGETATION sensor data, Int. J. Remote Sens., 23(11), 2213–2228.
- Sharma, K. P., B. Moore and C. J. Vörösmarty (2000), Anthropogenic, Climatic, and Hydrologic Trends in the Kosi Basin, Himalaya, Climatic Change, 47, 141–165.
- Moore, B. and B.H. Braswell (1994), The lifetime of excess atmospheric carbon dioxide. Global Biogeochemical Cycles, 8:23–38.
- Moore, B. and B.H. Braswell (1994), Planetary metabolism: Understanding the carbon cycle. Ambio. A Journal of the Human Environment, 23:4–12.
- Moore, B., C.J. Vörösmarty, and A.L. Schloss. 1997. Equilibrium responses of global net primary production and carbon storage to doubled atmospheric carbon dioxide: Sensitivity to changes in vegetation nitrogen concentration. Global Biogeochemical Cycles 11: 173–189
- Moore, B., B. Bolin, A. Bjorkstrom, K. Holmen, and C. Ringo (1989), Ocean carbon models and inverse methods. In D.L.T. Anderson and J. Willebrand (eds.), Oceanic Circulation Models: Combining Data and Dynamics. Kluwer Academic Publishers.
- Moore, B., R. D. Boone, J. E. Hobbie, R. A. Houghton, J. M. Melillo, B. J. Peterson, G. R. Shaver, C. J. Vörösmarty and G. M. Woodwell (1981), A simple model for analysis of the role of terrestrial ecosystems in the global carbon budget, pp. 365–385. In: B. Bolin (ed.), Modeling the Global Carbon Cycle, SCOPE 16. John Wiley and Sons, New York.
