= Chris Broyles =

American meteorologist

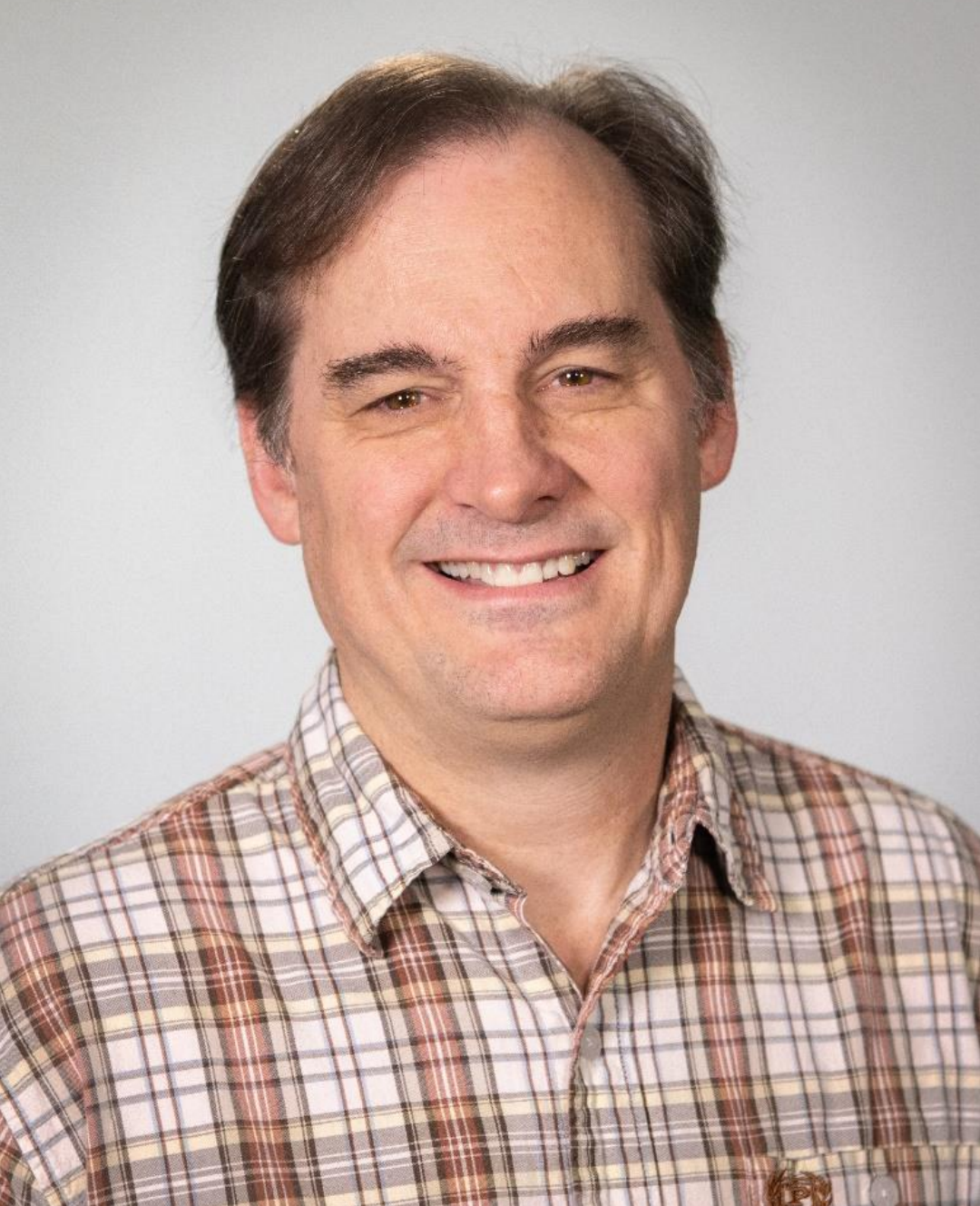
- Chris Broyles
- Occupation: Meteorologist
- Years active: 1994–present
- Known for: Forecaster at the Storm Prediction Center / Expert in tornado forecasting
- Notable work: Issuing the first and second-ever Day 2 High Risk Outlooks; expansive research on severe thunderstorms including the OMEGA Project

John C. "Chris" Broyles is an American meteorologist who is a weather forecaster and tornado forecasting expert with the Storm Prediction Center.

== Education ==
Broyles attended St. Edward's University in Texas, before transferring to the University of Northern Colorado, where he graduated with bachelor's degrees in meteorology and journalism.

== Career ==
In 1994, Broyles was hired as an intern at the National Weather Service (NWS) office in Jackson, Kentucky. Following his internship, Broyles was hired as a forecaster at the NWS office in Aberdeen, South Dakota. In 2003, Broyles was hired at the Storm Prediction Center (SPC) at the National Weather Center in Norman, Oklahoma as a forecaster. Throughout his career forecasting at the SPC, Broyles issued 14 High Risk Outlooks, with 11 verifications. On April 7, 2006, Broyles issued the first-ever Day-2 High Risk Outlook, in preparation for the tornado outbreak of April 6–8, 2006. This High Risk also included a 60% chance of tornadoes, including at least some becoming significant. Following verification of this High Risk, the United States Department of Commerce awarded Broyles with a silver medal. On April 14, 2012, Broyles issued the second-ever Day-2 High Risk Outlook, while forecasting for the tornado outbreak of April 13–16, 2012.

== Publications ==
Throughout his career, Broyles has authored and co-authored several academic papers and case studies. Besides academic publications, Broyles led a team of twenty others to create the National Oceanic and Atmospheric Administration's Violent Tornado webpage, which documented more than 200 tornado outbreaks throughout the United States' history.

- Forecasting tornado location across the Dakotas and Minnesota in 1998.
- The role of synoptic patterns and temperature and moisture distribution in determining the locations of strong and violent tornado episodes in the north central United States: A preliminary examination in 2000.
- The Effect of a Low-Level Boundary on the Development of the Panhandle, TX Tornadic Storm on 29 May 2001 in 2002.
- Synoptic and mesoscale characteristics associated with violent tornadoes across separate geographic regions of the United States: Part 1 – low-level characteristics & Part 2 – upper-level characteristics in 2002.
- Radar characteristics of violent tornadic storms using the NSSL algorithms across separate geographic regions of the United States in 2002.
- An Iterative Storm Segmentation and Classification Algorithm for Convection-Allowing Models and Gridded Radar Analyses in 2022.
- The OMEGA (Outlook Machine Assembling Algorithm) Project in 2022.
