= University of Oklahoma College of Engineering =

College in Norman, Oklahoma

Coordinates: 35°11′01″N 97°26′25″W

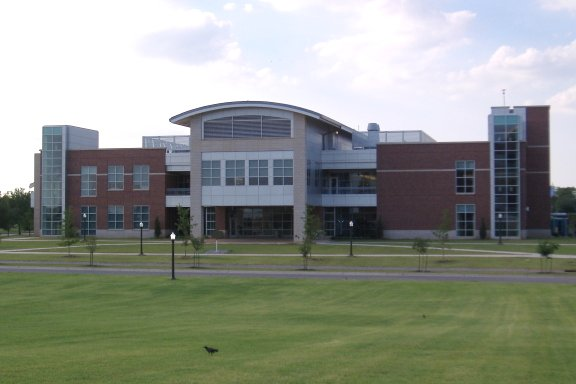
The Stephenson Research Center located on Norman's south campus.

The University of Oklahoma College of Engineering in the engineering unit of the University of Oklahoma in Norman. It has an enrollment of 2,086 undergraduates and 2,193 graduate students. In 2009, 257 bachelor's degrees, 92 master's degrees and 29 doctoral degrees were conferred.

== History ==
Engineering College Deans
James Felgar, 1909-1937
William Carson, 1937-1962
Gene Nordby, 1962-1970
William Upthegrove, 1970-1981
Martin Jischke, 1981-1985
John Francis (acting), 1985-1986
Tom Love (interim), 1986-1987
Billy Crynes, 1987-1998
W. Arthur "Skip" Porter, 1998-2005
Thomas Landers, 2005–present

The college was founded in 1909, but engineering work started five years before that under the School of Applied Science. By 1908 formal programs had been established in electrical, civil and mechanical engineering under the direction of the school's first dean, James Felgar, who would lead the soon to be created college for 28 years. The college's first spike in enrollment came in the 1930s, when demand for natural gas and oil led to the creation of programs in geological engineering and petroleum engineering. Until the 1970s, engineering students could be identified by the slide rules which were carried in a leather case on their belts.

The college's main offices are currently located on the bottom floor of Felgar Hall, which also houses the main offices for the mechanical and aerospace engineering department. The Engineering Laboratory building is also home to many offices for mechanical and aerospace engineering. Carson Engineering Center hosts many civil and industrial engineering offices as well. The first three floors of the Sarkeys Energy Center are home to the school of chemical engineering. In recent years, the college of engineering has rapidly expanded beyond these buildings as to the recently constructed Devon Energy Hall, for electrical and computer engineering, and the ExxonMobil Lawrence G. Rawl Engineering Practice Facility, which provides students and engineering organizations large scale work space. Four of these buildings (Carson, Felgar, Devon and the Practice Facility) create the "engineering quad" on the northeast section of OU's main campus. Additionally, many graduate level classes and research labs are located Stephenson Research Center located on Norman's south campus.

Between 1998 and 2002, the college had negotiated dozens of licenses and patent applications, marketed more than 55 inventions and helped with the formation of 12 start-up companies.

In 2010 the college celebrated its centennial with a variety of events, including a symposium with presentations from several prominent alumni, as well as a keynote address by renowned humanitarian and Three Cups of Tea author Greg Mortenson.

== Traditions ==
=== Irish Heritage ===
St. Patrick, who among other things is the patron saint of engineers, has long been the unofficial mascot of the College of Engineering. Paintings of shamrocks can be found in many of the engineering buildings, and the events celebrating National Engineers Week (U.S.) often have an Irish theme.

=== Loyal Knights of Old Trusty ===
The Loyal Knights of Old Trusty is a secret organization founded at the University of Oklahoma in 1920. That year a small group of engineers banded together and formed this secret order to uphold the traditions of the College of Engineering and to pay homage to the Patron Saint of Engineers, Saint Patrick. During this time it has served the College of Engineering in every possible way, but above all by keeping alive its cherished traditions. Until they unhood themselves at the "fireout" event during Engineers' Week each year, members are known only by their number and are only seen on campus wearing black hooded robes bearing their respective number. These students who wear the black robes are seldom seen but they represent an active and old tradition of the university. There are LKOT signs all around the campus at the entrances to university buildings and university houses.

=== Rivalry ===
The College of Engineering has a longstanding rivalry with the OU College of Law. Statues of owls in the facade of Monnet Hall, the former home of the law students, have been repeatedly painted green by engineering students, a practice that has been discontinued in recent years. For example, the owl statues on the law college's new building were painted green during E-Week of 2003, and a large banner was glued to the front of the building, causing several thousand dollars in damage.

== Academic programs ==
The college grants degrees at the Bachelor's, Master's, and PhD levels. Engineering fields covered at the college include:

- Aerospace Engineering
- Architectural Engineering
- Bioengineering
- Biomedical Engineering
- Chemical Engineering (standard, premedical/biomedical, and biotechnology)
- Civil Engineering
- Environmental Engineering
- Environmental Science
- Computer Engineering
- Computer Science
- Electrical Engineering
- Engineering Physics
- Geological Engineering
- Industrial Engineering (standard and information technology)
- Materials Engineering
- Mechanical Engineering
- Petroleum Engineering
