= Center for Analysis and Prediction of Storms =

The Center for Analysis and Prediction of Storms (CAPS) was established at the University of Oklahoma in 1989 as one of the first eleven National Science Foundation Science and Technology Centers. Located at the National Weather Center in Norman, Oklahoma, its mission is the development of techniques for the computer-based prediction of high-impact local weather, such as individual spring and winter storms, with the NEXRAD (WSR-88D) Doppler weather radar serving as a key data source.

== Activities ==
Since 1989, scientists in CAPS have developed and improved ARPS (The Advanced Regional Prediction System). ARPS is a comprehensive regional to storm-scale atmospheric modeling/prediction system. It is a complete system that includes a realtime data analysis and assimilation system, the forward prediction model and a post-analysis package. ARPS has been used successfully in many real thunderstorm cases in research.

== Development and project ==
CAPS, along with several other University of Oklahoma institutions, is a partner in a new Engineering Research Center led by the University of Massachusetts Amherst. The Engineering Research Center for Collaborative Adaptive Sensing of the Atmosphere (CASA) seeks to revolutionize the remote sensing of the lower troposphere, initially via inexpensive, low-power, phased array Doppler weather radars placed on cell towers and buildings. unique component of this project is that the sensors collaborate with one another and dynamically adjust their characteristics to sense multiple atmospheric phenomena while meeting multiple end user needs in an optimal manner.

CAPS also is leading an NSF Large Information Technology Research (ITR) grant that seeks to develop an infrastructure for mesoscale meteorology research and education. Known as Linked Environments for Atmospheric Discovery (LEAD), a transforming element of this project is the ability for analysis tools, forecast models, and data repositories to function as dynamically adaptive, on-demand systems that can change configuration rapidly and automatically in response to the evolving weather; respond immediately to user decisions based upon the weather problem at hand; and steer remote observing systems to optimize data collection and forecast/warning quality.
