= University of Oklahoma Observatory =

Observatory in Oklahoma, US

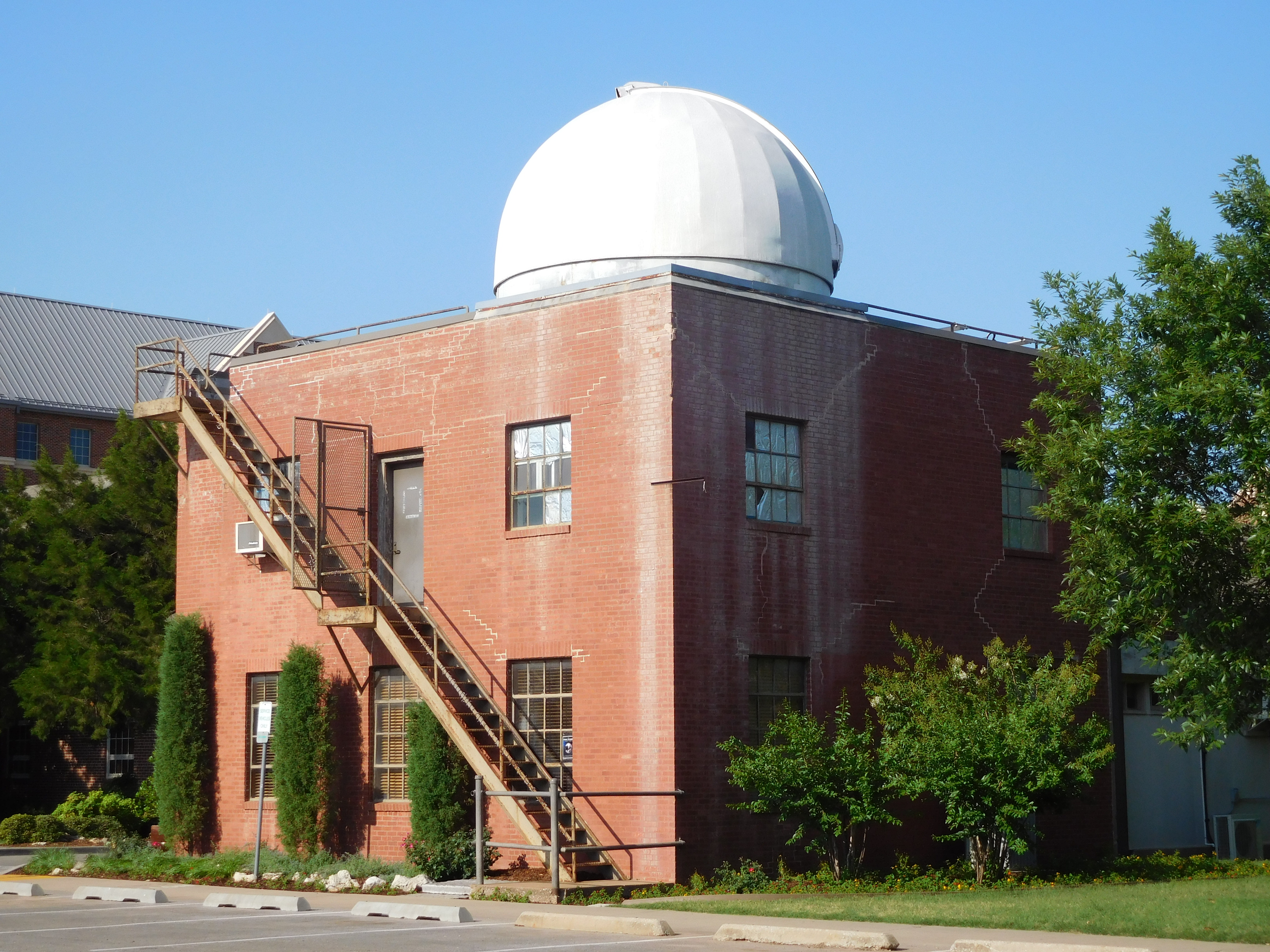
- In 2018
- Organization: University of Oklahoma
- Observatory code: H30
- Location: Norman, Oklahoma, U.S.
- Coordinates: 35°12′09″N 97°26′38.6″W
- Altitude: 372 m (1,220 ft)
- Website: observatory.ou.edu

Telescopes
- Unnamed Telescope: 16-inch reflector

University of Oklahoma Observatory (IAU code H30) is an astronomical observatory. It is located in Norman, Oklahoma on the campus of the University of Oklahoma. Built in 1939, with a 10-inch Newtonian reflector and a smaller 3.5-inch telescope, it was housed in a 16-foot dome atop what was at the time the southernmost building on campus. In 1995, the original 10-inch telescope was replaced by a 0.4 meters (16 inches) Meade SCT.

== See also ==
- List of observatories
- "University of Oklahoma Observatory Homepage". University of Oklahoma Observatory.
- Article from Sooner Magazine announcing the observatory's construction
