= Memorial Union (University of Oklahoma) =

Oklahoma Memorial Union University of Oklahoma
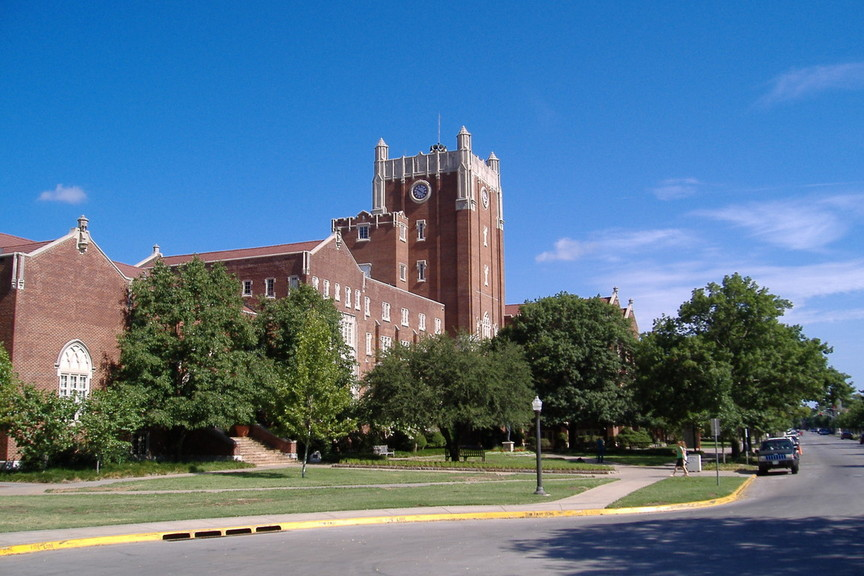
- Interactive map of the Oklahoma Memorial Union University of Oklahoma area

General information
- Type: Student union
- Coordinates: 35°12′35″N 97°26′37″W
- Opened: 1929
- Renovated: Clock tower 1936, 1951, 2007

Website
- http://union.ou.edu

The Oklahoma Memorial Union (OMU) is the University of Oklahoma's student union, or student activity center. The Union was completed in 1929 as a memorial to the students, faculty, and staff of the university who fought and died in World War I.

The Union has more than 26 meeting and activity rooms and eight dining kiosks. The Meacham Auditorium has 400 seats, and the Molly Shi Boren Ballroom, on the third floor, seats up to 500 banquet guests.

== History ==
OU students began an effort to build a student union in 1921. The movement grew, and by 1925 serious efforts began for construction of a combination student union and football stadium. The original architect's drawing for the combined facility showed a facade quite similar to the present day union. However, the consolidated union/stadium was scrapped after football coach Bennie Owen said it would be best to build two structures, a stadium and a student union, instead of one. Construction of the Union began in 1929 at an original cost of US$350,000, which came from the million dollar fundraising campaign – the first in the university's history – to build both structures.

The plans called for the construction of the outer shell of the building so it could be filled in with offices and rooms as the university grew. When the central part of the Union was finished, students and faculty enjoyed a large cafeteria, a book exchange, and a large open area with two regulation-sized bowling alleys and several pool & snooker tables on the ground floor. Offices, a men's lounge, and the ballroom were located on the second and third floors. The Union's landmark 99-foot (30 m) clock tower was completed in 1936 as a Works Progress Administration project. Carillon bells were installed in the tower in 1955.

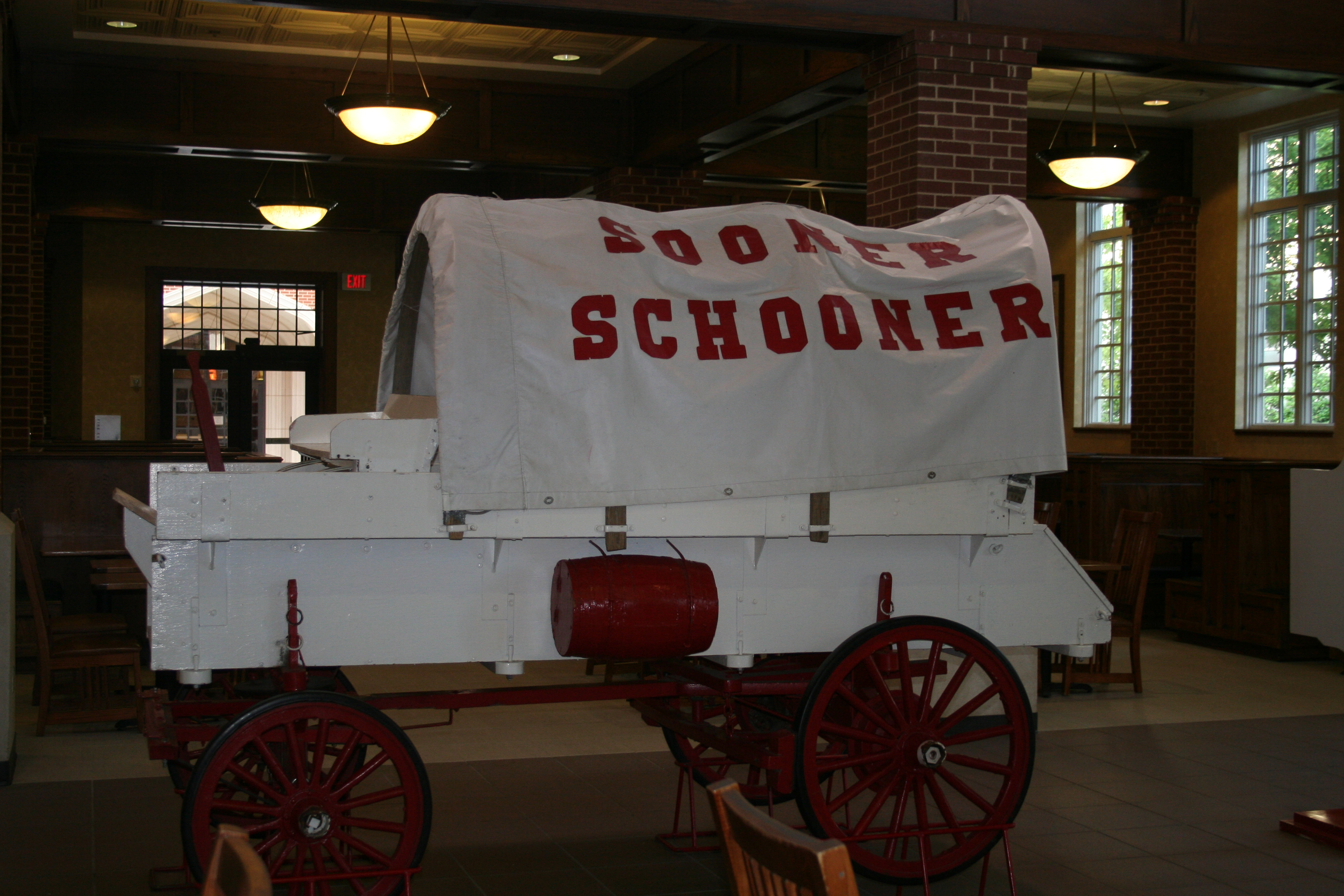
A downsized model of the Sooner Schooner sits inside the Will Rogers dining area in the Union.

When enrollment at the university skyrocketed after World War II ended, momentum increased to complete the interior of the structure. The north and south wings of the building, including the Meacham Auditorium, were completed in 1951 for $2.3 million. The cafeteria expanded into the north wing and was renamed the Will Rogers Cafeteria, to honor Will Rogers. Small retail shops opened on the ground floor, and student groups and some administration offices occupied the first and second floors of the south wing.

After this construction, the Union began a period of decline as the university's campus expanded south. By the time the Union Parking Garage was completed in the early 1980s, the Will Rogers Cafeteria, once Norman's favorite Sunday-after-church luncheon spot, had become a relic, and its decor – and food offerings – were firmly stuck in the 1950s. The book exchange was only large enough to hold the engineering texts and supplies; Crossroads Restaurant was the lone competition to the Will Rogers Cafeteria. The new student dormitories were over half a mile (0.8 kilometers) south along with new classroom buildings. The Union was quiet except for banquet traffic, from both student groups and Norman-area businesses and civic organizations, and visits to Career Planning and Placement (now OU Career Services), the university's employment office for graduating seniors, on the third floor.

Soon after the parking garage was opened, student organization offices began to move back into the Union, which brought more foot traffic into the building. As enrollment again increased in the late 1980s and early 1990s, small areas were refurbished on an intermittent basis, but it was clear that the Union needed more than cosmetic improvements. When the university's 13th president, David Boren, arrived in 1994, he and his wife Molly led a $11.5 million campaign to remodel the building. The result was a facility that welcomed students, and the Union quickly regained its status as a campus gathering place.

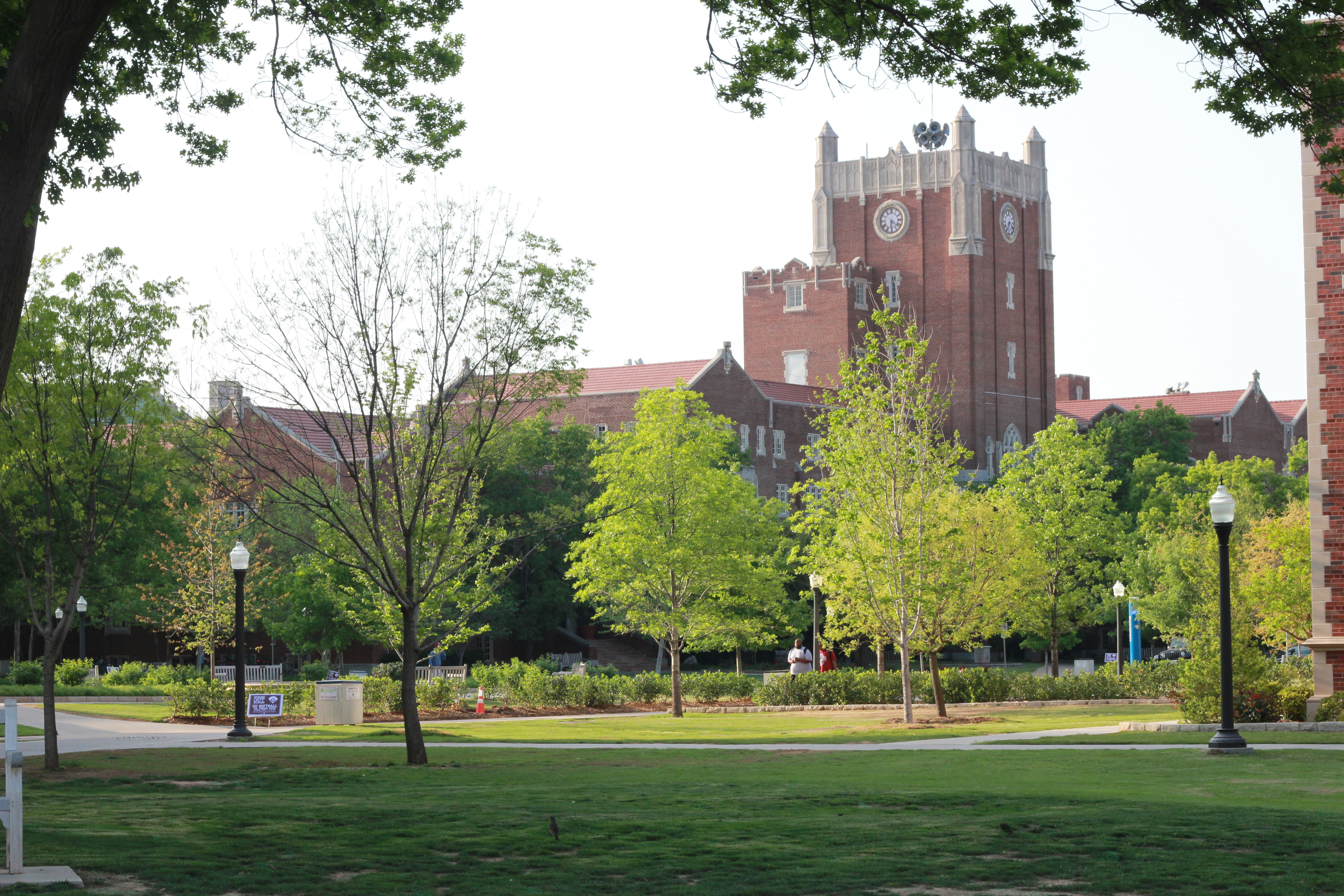
Oklahoma Memorial Union - Univ. of Oklahoma, Norman, OK

In October 2006, custodians began to notice small paint chips and sawdust on window sills on the Union's third floor. Expert inspectors quickly deduced that the roof beams above the third floor were pushing the lintels on the third floor windows down, which pushed the walls apart and also pressed against the walls of the north wing. Construction quickly began to rescue the building, and more than $1 million was spent to remove the brick on the east and west sides of the building, strengthen the beams, and repair the walls. The work was completed in the spring of 2007.
