= University of Oklahoma University College =

American college for first year students

The University of Oklahoma University College is the college that new students are part of prior to their formal declaration of a major and matriculation into another specialized college within the university. The University College does not grant degrees, but allows incoming students to explore their options before selecting a major.

The University of Oklahoma founded the University College in 1942, and suggests that it was one of the first programs in the United States designed to meet the needs of first year students. The purpose of the University College is to aid in the transition to college and to hopefully prepare students for academic success. Many colleges and universities now have first year programs similar to the University College model.
