= National Weather Center =

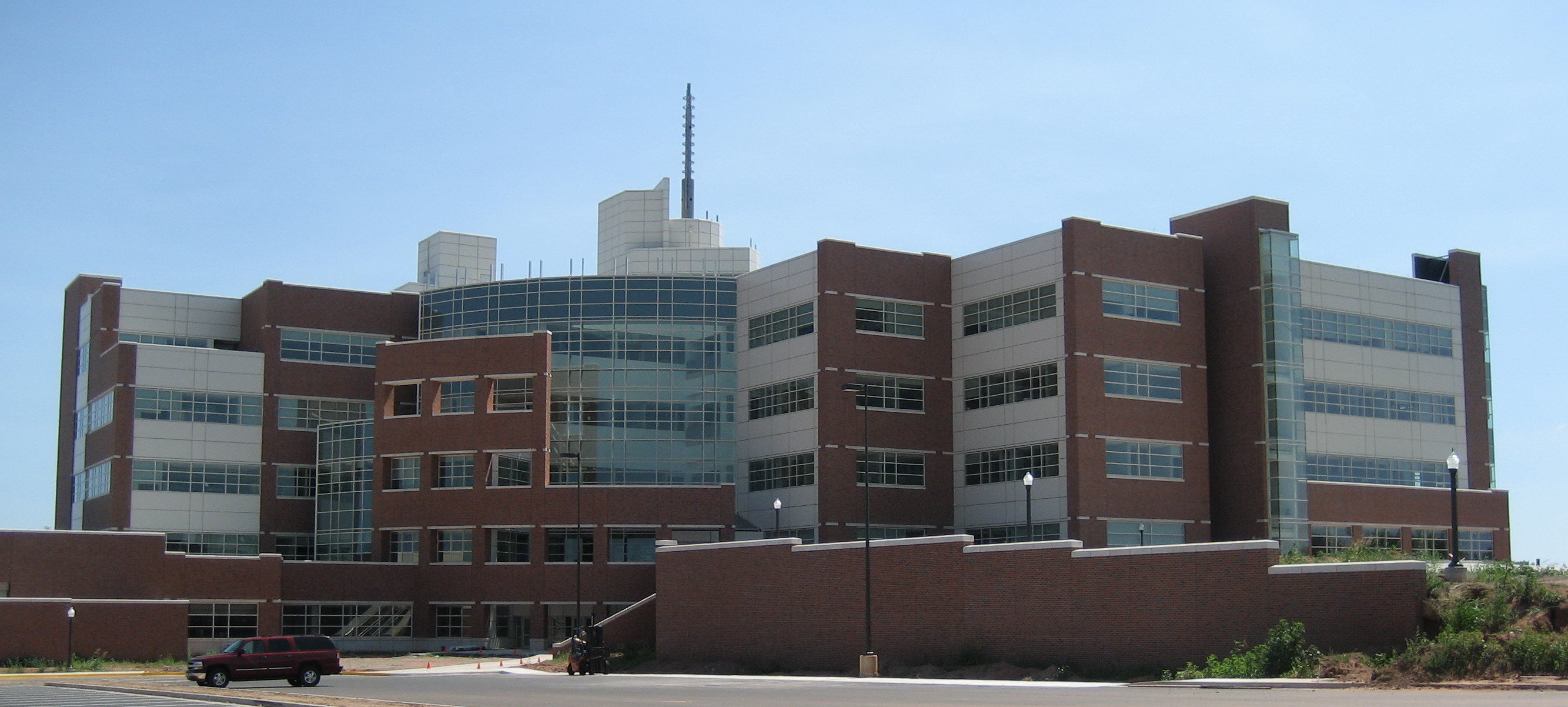
- The National Weather Center building in 2006

- Location within Oklahoma

General information
- Status: Completed
- Location: 120 David L. Boren Boulevard, Norman, Oklahoma, United States
- Coordinates: 35°10′53″N 97°26′25″W
- Current tenants: NOAA; University of Oklahoma; State of Oklahoma and others
- Groundbreaking: November 2002
- Construction started: August 2003
- Opened: Summer 2006
- Cost: US$500 million
- Client: NOAA; University of Oklahoma

Technical details
- Floor count: 5
- Floor area: 250,000 sq ft (23,000 m^{2})
- Lifts/elevators: 3
- Grounds: 22 acres

Design and construction
- Architecture firm: Beck – LAN/Daly
- Main contractor: Oscar J. Boldt Company

Website
- nwc.ou.edu

The National Weather Center (NWC), on the campus of the University of Oklahoma, is a confederation of federal, state, and academic organizations that work together to better understand events that take place in Earth's atmosphere over a wide range of time and space scales. The NWC partners give equal attention to applying that understanding to the development of improved observation, analysis, assimilation, display, and prediction systems. The National Weather Center also has expertise in local and regional climate, numerical modeling, hydrology, and weather radar. Members of the NWC work with a wide range of federal, state, and local government agencies to help reduce loss of life and property to hazardous weather, ensure wise use of water resources, and enhance agricultural production. They also work with private sector partners to develop new applications of weather and regional climate information that provide competitive advantage in the marketplace.

== National Weather Center Partners ==
The National Weather Center building houses many organizations from the National Oceanic and Atmospheric Administration and the University of Oklahoma and several other organizations outside the NOAA or OU.

- National Oceanic and Atmospheric Administration (NOAA)

- Office of Oceanic and Atmospheric Research (OAR)

- National Severe Storms Laboratory (NSSL)

- National Weather Service (NWS)

- Norman Weather Forecast Office (OUN WFO)
- Storm Prediction Center (SPC)
- Radar Operations Center (ROC)
- Warning Decision Training Division (WDTD)

- National Centers for Environmental Prediction (NCEP)

- Storm Prediction Center (SPC)

- University of Oklahoma (OU)

- College of Atmospheric & Geographic Sciences (A&GS)

- School of Meteorology (SoM)

- Advanced Radar Research Center (ARRC)
- Center for Analysis and Prediction of Storms (CAPS)
- Cooperative Institute for Mesoscale Meteorological Studies (CIMMS)

- Department of Geography and Environmental Sustainability (GEOG)

- Environmental Verification and Analysis Center/Oklahoma Wind Power Initiative (EVAC/OWPI)

- College of Engineering (CoE)

- School of Computer Science (CS)
- School of Electrical and Computer Engineering (ECE)

- Information Technology

- Integrated Robust Assured Data Services (IRADS)

- State of Oklahoma

- Oklahoma Climatological Survey (OCS)
- Oklahoma Mesonet
- Oklahoma Water Survey (OKWS)

- Other (public and private)

- Office of Weather Programs and Projects (OWPP)
- Oklahoma NASA Space Grant Consortium (OSGC)
- Sasaki Applied Meteorology Research Institute
- South Central Climate Science Center (SCCSC)
- United States Department of the Interior Climate Science Centers (South Central Region)

== Notable employees ==
- Robert Palmer, American radar meteorologist (Current Director of the National Weather Center)
- Berrien Moore III, American mathematician and earth scientist (Former Director of the National Weather Center)
- Chris Broyles, American meteorologist and tornado forecasting expert (SPC)
- Anthony Lyza, American meteorologist and tornado expert (NSSL)
- Roger Edwards (SPC)
- Donald W. Burgess, American meteorologist (OU / CIWRO / NSSL)
- DaNa Carlis, American meteorologist (Director, NSSL)
- Charles A. Doswell III, American meteorologist (OU / CIWRO / NSSL / SPC)
- Richard Doviak, American radar meteorologist (OU / NSSL / ARRC)
- Dusan Zrnic, American radar meteorologist (OU / NSSL / ARRC)
- Erik N. Rasmussen (OU / NSSL)

== 2015 security incident ==
On the afternoon of April 23, 2015, a car rammed through the gates that protect the loading dock on the building's east side. It drove toward the building before it burst into flames approximately halfway between the gates and the building. Firefighters and a bomb squad were called to the scene. Responders extinguished the fire with no damage done to the building. Despite a rescue attempt, the driver, Allen Rouse, was found dead on the scene. Rouse, suffering from schizophrenia and paranoia, had killed himself.

== Employee terminations and protests ==
Following the second inauguration of Donald Trump as President of the United States, and the creation of the Department of Government Efficiency (DOGE) on January 20, 2025, several major changes occurred across the United States, including changes to the National Oceanic and Atmospheric Administration and to OU. These changes to the University of Oklahoma included employees being terminated, protests on campus outside the National Weather Center, threats from the federal government of lease terminations, and grants being terminated.
