= Mewbourne College of Earth and Energy =

The Mewbourne College of Earth and Energy is the earth science unit at the University of Oklahoma in Norman. Currently, the school has an enrollment of 931 students, of which 728 are undergraduates and 203 are graduates.

The college was chartered on January 1, 2006, under a reorganization. The college includes two schools: the Mewbourne School of Petroleum and Geological Engineering and the ConocoPhillips School of Geology and Geophysics, and the Oklahoma Geological Survey (a state agency mandated by the Oklahoma Constitution).

The main offices for the college are located in Sarkeys Energy Center on the northeast corner of campus.

On November 2, 2007, it was announced that the college would be renamed the Mewbourne College of Earth and Energy in order to honor Curtis Mewbourne, a resident of Tyler, Texas, a 1958 OU graduate in petroleum engineering and one of the college's most prolific donors (he is the namesake for the School of Petroleum and Geological Engineering). In 1982, he had endowed the Curtis Mewbourne Professorship in Petroleum Engineering. Then he made a $6 million gift in 2000 to the School of Petroleum and Geological Engineering. OU renamed the college in recognition of Mewbourne's support. In November 2000, he challenged other alumni and supporters of the college to endow undergraduate scholarships and graduate fellowships for students in petroleum engineering, geological engineering, geology and geophysics. He said he would match the gifts made between then and March 2008.

== Academic programs ==
- Geology
  - General
  - Petroleum Geology
  - Paleontology
- Geophysics
  - General
  - Exploration
- Petroleum Engineering

== Notable faculty ==
David Deming, professor at the University of Oklahoma, and global warming critic, later was transferred to the College of Arts and Sciences.
