= Advanced Radar Research Center =

U.S. academic radar program

The Advanced Radar Research Center (ARRC) is an academic radar program within the United States. Its core mission revolves around the realm of interdisciplinary research, where it researches radar solutions to address a myriad of complex societal challenges.

Led by its founding Director Dr. Robert Palmer, the ARRC was established in 2005 at the University of Oklahoma (OU), and it now resides within the Radar Innovation Lab (RIL) and two other buildings. Palmer stepped down after 20 years with the ARRC to take on the roles of Dean of OU's College of Atmospheric and Geographic Sciences (AGS) and Director of the National Weather Center (NWC). While its inception was primarily in the pursuit of advancing radar technology for scientific exploration, the ARRC has since broadened its horizons, embracing a diverse array of radar applications and the field of applied electromagnetics.

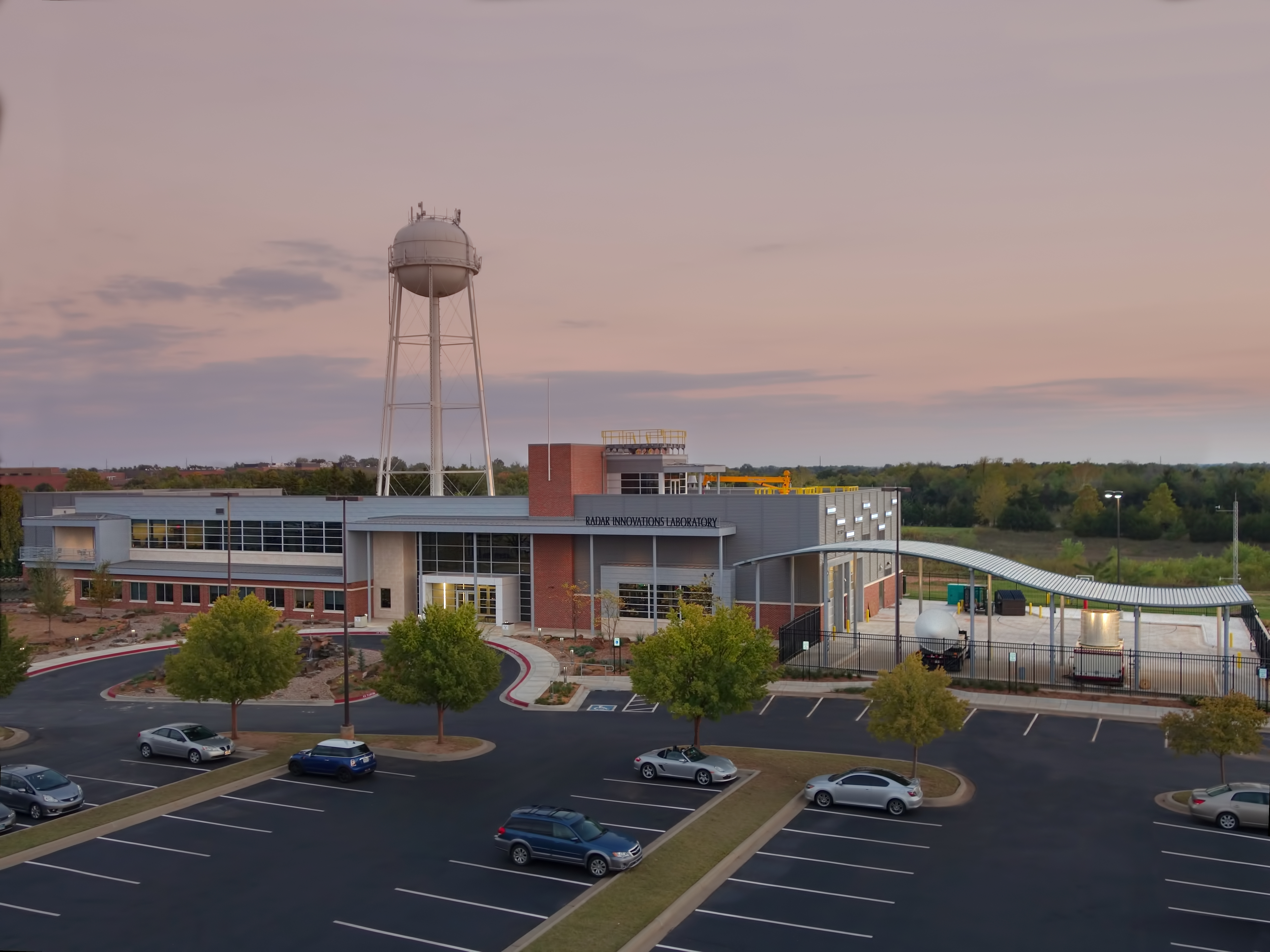
Radar Innovation Lab

In Norman, Oklahoma. The current Executive Director of ARRC is Dr. Nathan Goodman.

The ARRC has 20 faculty members, 35 full-time technical staff, and over 80 interdisciplinary graduate students. Active areas of research include: weather/atmospheric radar, severe storms/hydrometeorology, remote sensing, defense radars/sensors, signal processing/AI/ML, spectrum sharing, applied electromagnetics/antennas, automotive radar, biomedical sensors, UAS, CUAS, rapid prototyping, and microwave/mmW components/packaging.

== Radar Systems ==
The Advanced Radar Research Center currently has 5 operational radar, as well as one non operational radar.

- Horus
  - S-band Phased Array Radar
- PX1000 (Polarimetric X-band 1000)
  - 9550 MHz (X-band)
- RaXPol (Rapid X-band Polarimetric Radar)
  - 9730 MHz (X-band)
- PX-10k (Polarimetric X-band 10,000)
  - 9300-9400 MHz (X-band)
- CPPAR (Cylindrical Polarimetric Phased Array Radar)
  - 2900 MHz (S-band)
- AIR (Atmospheric Imaging Radar)
  - 9550 MHz (X-band)
  - Retired in 2019
