= Composite reflectivity =

#1 the fuchsia colored region, visible on the composite image, is all but missing on the base reflectivity #2 and #3, show more rain supported by strong updrafts.

The composite reflectivity is the maximum dBZ reflectivity from any of the reflectivity angles of the NEXRAD weather radar. In the Composite, the highest intensities amongst those available in the different angles above each point of the image will be displayed. In the Canadian weather radar network, this is called MAXR, for Maximum reflectivity in the column.

== Principle ==
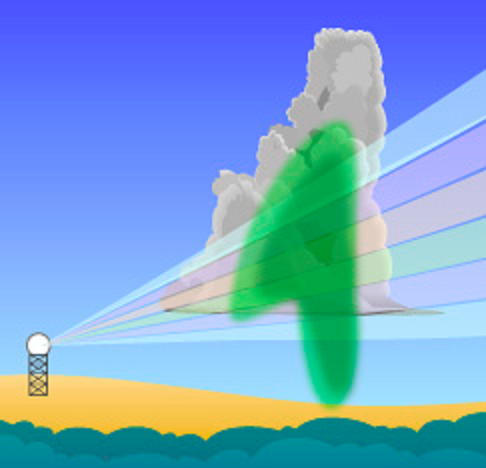
Scans at different angles by a weather radar.

A weather radar sequentially surveys a series of vertical angles over 360 degrees in azimuth. The reflectivity at each of these angles represents the rate of precipitation along a cone that rises away from the radar. Every angle can be seen on a PPI image. However, this rate varies with altitude and an individual PPI does not give a complete idea of the vertical structure of precipitation. In the United States NEXRAD network some of these angles are .5, 1.45, 2.4, and 3.35 degrees with the radar having up to 14 angles when it is in Severe Mode.

In the composite reflectivity product, the highest intensities among those available on the different angles above each point in the image will be displayed. It is a radar product created to compare low-level reflectivity with total reflectivity in the air column in order to identify certain cloud characteristics or artifacts in radar data.

=== Variants ===
One might want to only compare the precipitation in a certain layer above ground, instead of the whole column, and the base level reflectivity. Such subset composite radar products used by the National Weather Service with the NEXRAD data are:

- The layer composite reflectivity average which compiles data from all elevation angles of a given layer above ground and display the average reflectivity of that layer.
- The layer composite reflectivity maximum radar product compiles data from all elevation angles of a given layer to display the maximum reflectivity of that layer.

== Use ==
When compared to the base angle reflectivity, the lowest angle of elevation sounding, the composite reflectivity, including higher elevation scan information, may appear to indicate more widespread rain. This could indicate one of different things:

- Virga: the precipitation (rain or snow) is probably not reaching the ground but evaporating as it falls from very high in the atmosphere. This is a regular situation in winter as snowflakes can easily sublimate in dry air near the ground.
- Strong updrafts: air rising in a thunderstorm updraft will saturate at higher level than the rest of the cloud forming an overhang region. In case of a very strong updraft, a Bounded weak echo region (BWER) will form and lead to the possibility of severe weather.
- Presence of a bright band: Melting snow above ground create a higher reflectivity layer overlapping the base PPI.
