= Tornado vortex signature =

Weather radar pattern

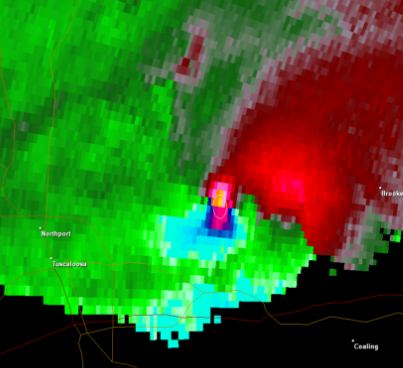
Strong mesocyclone on a thunderstorm near Tuscaloosa, Alabama, that was analyzed as fitting the characteristics of a TVS. It was associated with a tornado.

A tornadic vortex signature, abbreviated TVS, is a Pulse-Doppler radar weather radar detected rotation algorithm that indicates the likely presence of a strong mesocyclone that is in some stage of tornadogenesis. It may give meteorologists the ability to pinpoint and track the location of tornadic rotation within a larger storm, and is one component of the National Weather Service's warning operations.

The tornadic vortex signature was first identified by Donald W. Burgess, Leslie R. Lemon, and Rodger A. Brown in the 1970s using experimental Doppler radar at the National Severe Storms Laboratory (NSSL) to scan the 1973 Union City tornado, the first time such a signature was observed. The National Weather Service (NWS) now uses an updated algorithm developed by NSSL, the tornado detection algorithm (TDA) based on data from its WSR-88D system of radars. NSSL also developed the mesocyclone detection algorithm (MDA).

== Display ==
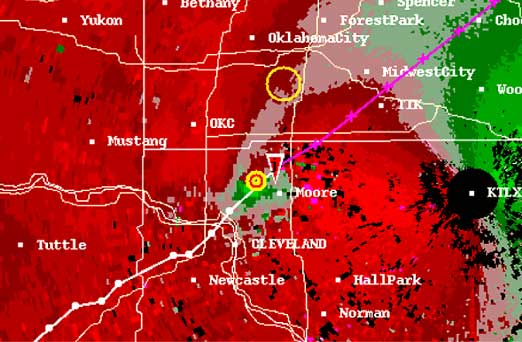
Typical display of a tornado vortex signature (the downward-pointing triangle near the mesocyclone) on a National Weather Service Doppler weather radar display (here the case of the 1999 Bridge Creek-Moore tornado).

The conditions causing a TVS are often visible on the Doppler weather radar storm relative velocity (SRV) product as adjacent inbound and outbound velocities, a signature known as a velocity couplet or "gate-to-gate" shear. In most cases, the TVS is a strong mesocyclone aloft, not an actual tornado, although the presence of an actual tornado on the ground can occasionally be inferred based on a strong couplet in concert with a tornadic debris signature (TDS) (i.e. a "debris ball" on reflectivity or certain polarimetric characteristics), or through confirmation from storm spotters. When the algorithm is tripped, a TVS icon (typically a triangle representing a vortex) and pertinent information appear. Radar analysis of the velocity couplet as well as the automated TVS are very significant to issuing tornado warnings and can suggest the strength and location of possible tornadoes. Although many tornadoes, especially the stronger ones, coincide with a TVS, many weak EF0-EF1 tornadoes can and do occur without a TVS, especially if they are not produced from an identified mesocyclone. Likewise, phenomena such as "fair-weather" waterspouts, landspouts, and gustnadoes, though cyclonic and occasionally damaging, do not normally produce a signature identifiable by a TVS. Rotation associated with quasi-linear convective systems (QLCSs) or squall lines can trip the TVS but do so less reliably as the couplets typically are more transient, are shallower, smaller, and weaker. This rotation may be considered a mesovortex rather than a mesocyclone but these do produce tornadoes and damaging straight-line winds.

== Intensity ==
A TVS can be measured by intense gate to gate wind shear, which is the change of wind speed and/or direction across the two gates of inbound and outbound velocities. Gates are the individual pixels on the radar display. For example, if the inbound velocity is −48 knots (−89 km/h) and the outbound is 39 knots (72 km/h), then there is 87 knots (161 km/h) of gate to gate shear. The impressiveness of a TVS not only has to do with the strength of the gate to gate shear, but it also incorporates the size and depth of the TVS, and the strength of any surrounding mesocyclone, among other factors, including several vertically-polarized variables with the advent of dual-polarization.

== See also ==
- Convective storm detection
- Hook echo
- Bounded weak echo region (BWER)
- Warning Decision Training Branch, Cooperative Institute for Mesoscale Meteorological Studies, Center for Analysis and Prediction of Storms, Advanced Radar Research Center
