= Bounded weak echo region =

Weather feature

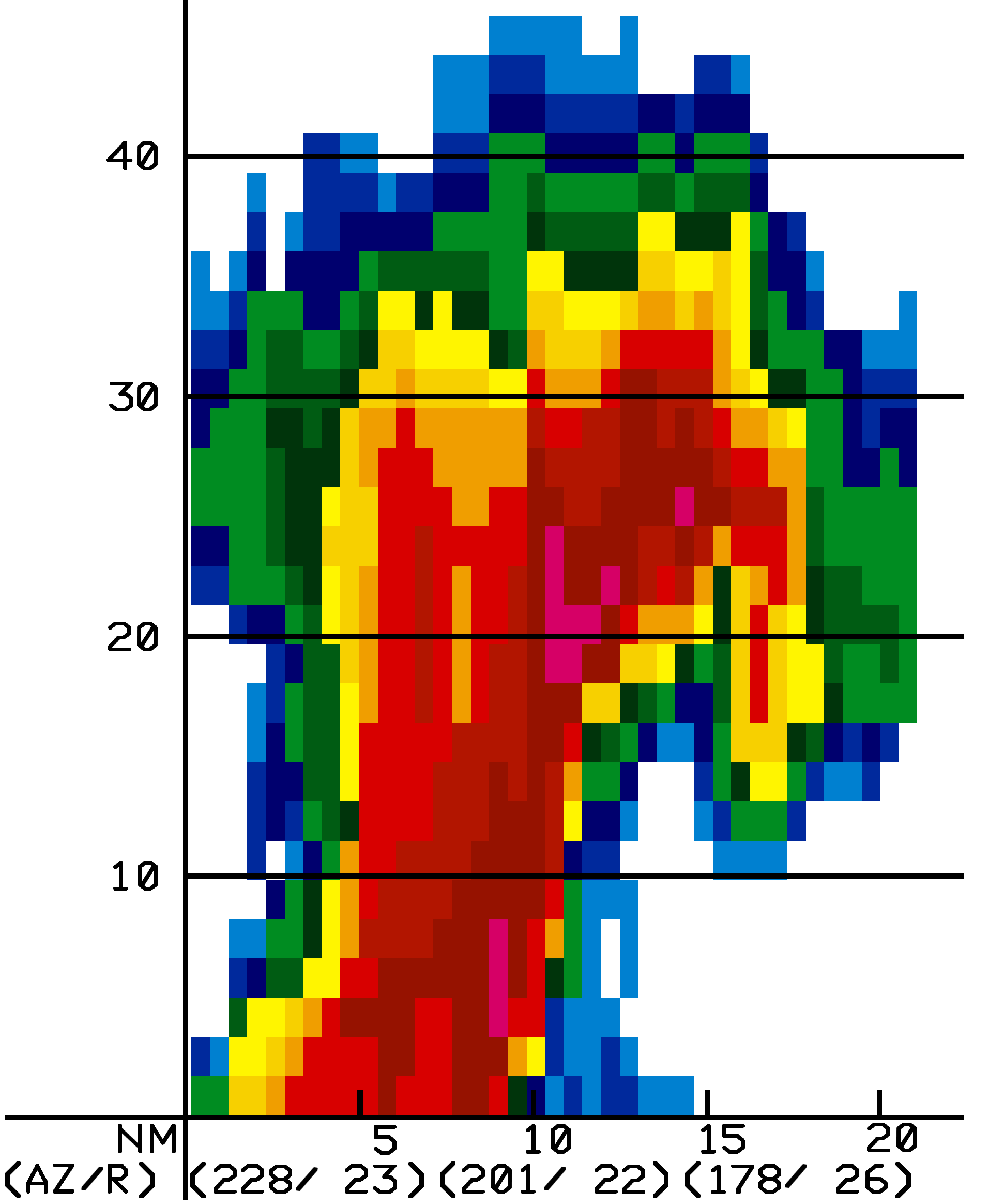
Vertical cross-section through a supercell showing the BWER.

The bounded weak echo region, also known as a BWER or a vault, is a radar signature within a thunderstorm characterized by a local minimum in radar reflectivity at low levels which extends upward into, and is surrounded by higher reflectivities aloft, forming a kind of dome of weak echoes. This feature is associated with a strong updraft and is almost always found in the inflow region of a thunderstorm: it cannot be seen visually. The BWER has been noted on radar imagery of severe thunderstorms since 1973 and has a lightning detection system equivalent known as a lightning hole.

== Description and attributes ==
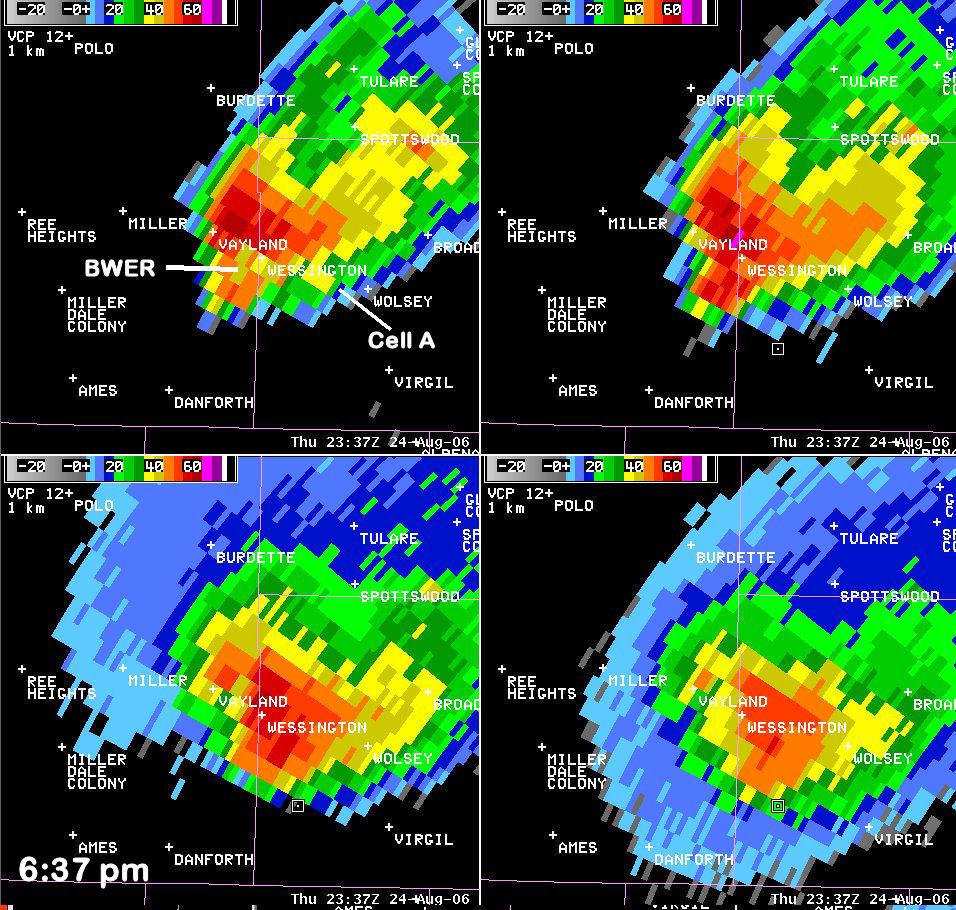
BWER associated with a tornadic supercell in 2006, as seen from different elevation angles. The lower angles (upper left) shows a weaker area of reflectivity but not at higher levels.

The BWER is a nearly vertical channel of weak radar echo, surrounded on the sides and top by significantly stronger echoes. The BWER, sometimes called a vault, is related to the strong updraft in a severe convective storm that carries newly formed atmospheric particulates, called hydrometeors, to high levels before they can grow to radar-detectable sizes. BWERs are typically found at mid-levels of convective storms, 3 kilometres (1.9 mi) to 10 kilometres (6.2 mi) above the ground, and are a few kilometers in horizontal diameter. Identifying the location of the updraft region is important because it is linked to locations where severe weather normally occurs. The presence of a BWER has been part of a method to diagnose thunderstorm strength as part of the Lemon technique since 1977. The updraft strength within the BWER supports the growth of large hailstones just above the vault, which is displaced slightly into the direction of motion of the parent supercell storm.

=== Detection ===
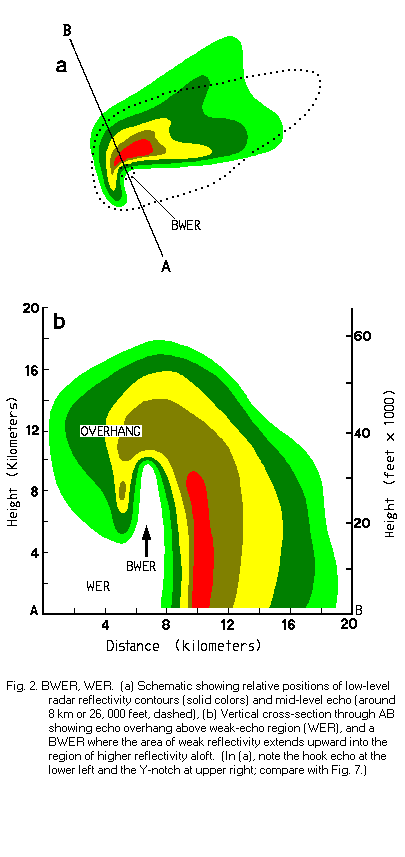
Radar schematics of the BWER

The bounded weak echo region (BWER) is a region of low radar reflectivity bounded above by an area of higher radar reflectivity which shows evidence of a strong updraft within mesocyclones. Radar analysts have recognized this phenomenon since at least 1973, using different elevation scans. Methods of objectively corroborating that a BWER is associated with a mesocyclone involve using a weather radar with the Doppler effect to obtain the precipitation velocities. This have been available operationally in United States since 1997 with the NEXRAD network. When using the lightning detection system, lightning holes (uncovered in 2004) correspond to where a BWER would be seen on radar.

A cross-section of the three-dimensional reflectivity of a thunderstorm shows the vault better. Algorithms were developed by the J.S. Marshall Radar Observatory of McGill University in Canada to locate the overhang region in a thunderstorm by the late 1980s. Its radar uses 24 angles, giving it good vertical resolution. In the United States, fewer scanning angles are made within the WSR-88D radar, which makes it more difficult to detect the overhang. Once the overhang is located, it is possible to make a cross-section to view if it is related with a BWER. However, since 1997, algorithms have been developed by the National Weather Service to determine regions of reflectivity gradient in three dimensions and the presence of BWER in convection.

The development of a pronounced BWER can lead to tropical cyclone-like radar signatures over land when located with a low angle plan position indicator (PPI). In the lightning detection system, lightning holes (uncovered in 2004) correspond to locations where a BWER would appear on radar.

== See also ==
- Tornado and tornadogenesis
- Hook echo
- Hail spike
- Convective storm detection
