= Hook echo =

Weather radar signature indicating tornadic circulation in a supercell thunderstorm

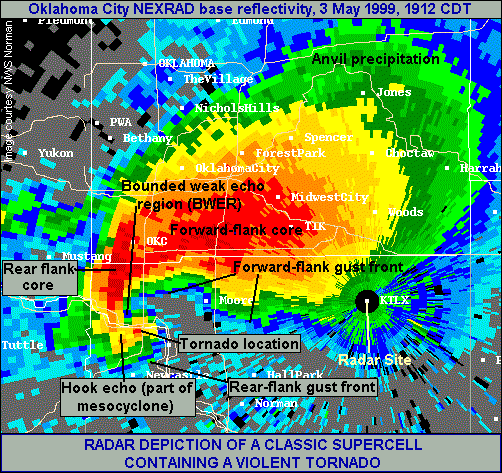
Classic-style hook echo of the F5 1999 Bridge Creek-Moore tornado.

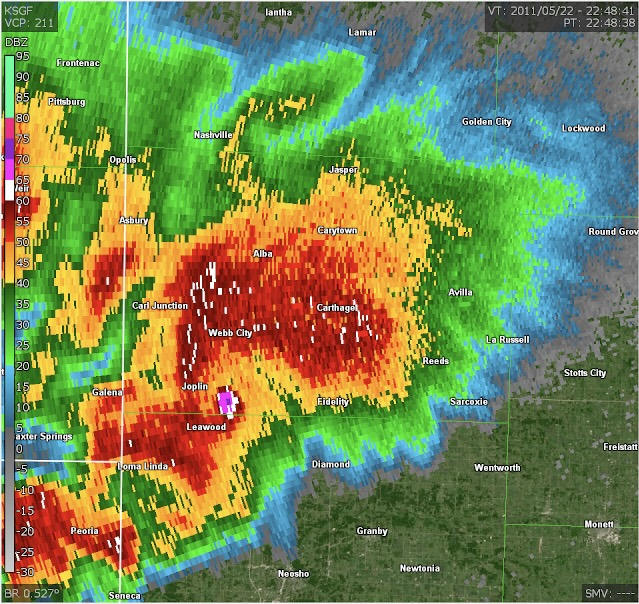
A hook echo present on a radar image of the May 22, 2011 Joplin EF5 tornado. The signature, along with a debris ball, is present on the bottom-left portion of the supercell that produced the tornado. Note the precipitation filled hook region, indicating a high precipitation (HP) storm mode.

A hook echo is a pendant or hook-shaped weather radar signature as part of some supercell thunderstorms. It is found in the lower portions of a storm as air and precipitation flow into a mesocyclone, resulting in a curved feature of reflectivity. The echo is produced by rain, hail, or debris being wrapped around the supercell. It is one of the classic hallmarks of tornado-producing supercells. The National Weather Service may consider the presence of a hook echo coinciding with a tornado vortex signature as sufficient to justify issuing a tornado warning.

== History ==
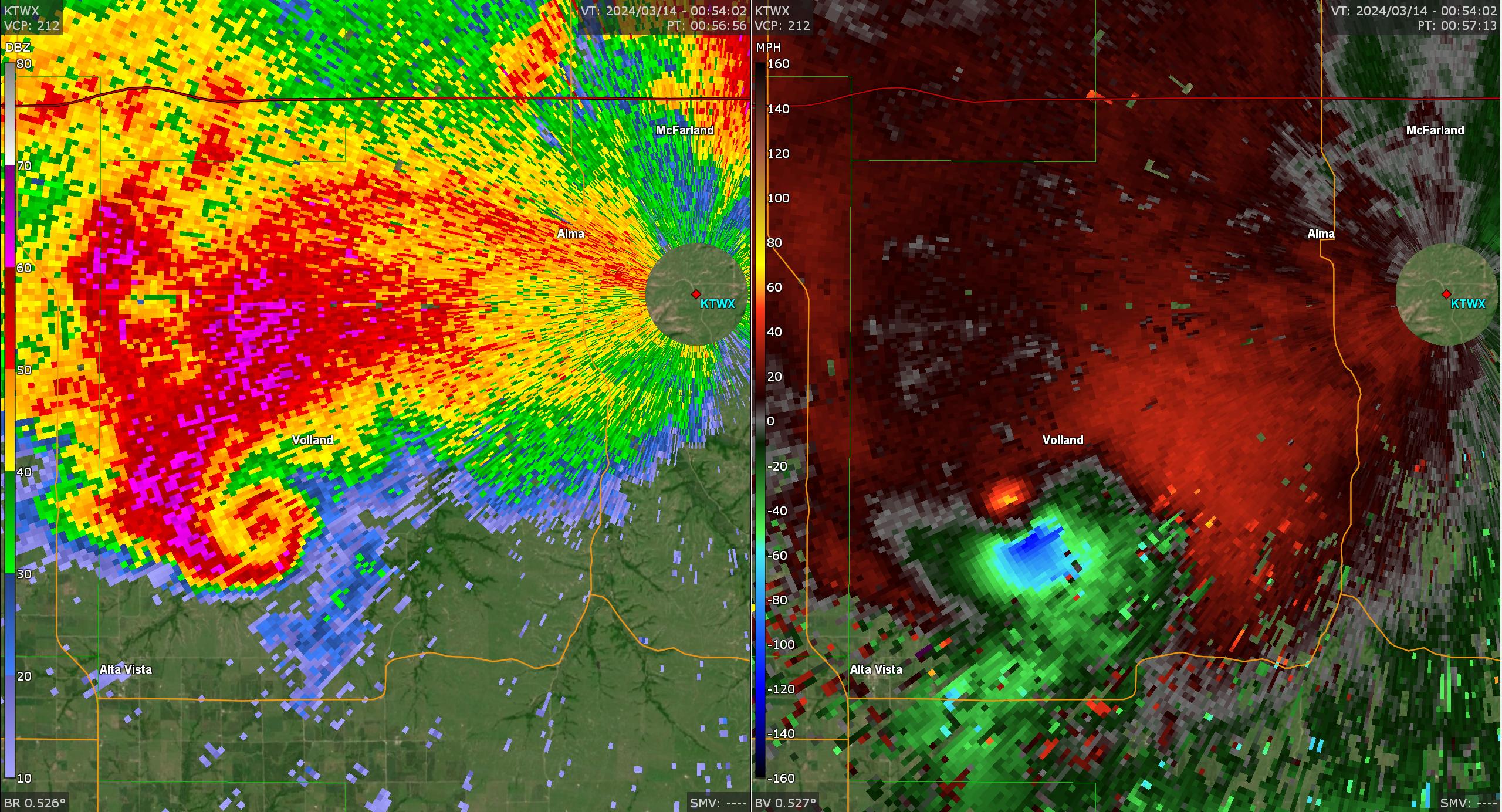
Classic hook echo can be seen for this Kansas EF2 tornado in 2024

Because of the unpredictable and potentially catastrophic nature of tornadoes, the possibility of detecting tornadoes via radar was discussed in the meteorological community in the earliest days of meteorological radar. The first association between tornadoes and the hook echo was discovered by E.M. Brooks in 1949. Brooks noted circulations with radii of approximately 8–16 km on radar. These circulations were associated with supercell thunderstorms and were dubbed “tornado cyclones” by Brooks.

The first documented association between a hook echo and a confirmed tornado occurred near Champaign–Urbana, Illinois, on 9 April 1953. This event was unintentionally discovered by Illinois State Water Survey electrical engineer Donald Staggs. Staggs was repairing and testing an experimental precipitation measurement radar unit when he noticed an unusual radar echo which was associated with a nearby thunderstorm. The unusual echo appeared to be an area of precipitation in the shape of the number six - hence the modern term “hook echo”. Staggs chose to record the echo for further analysis by meteorologists. Upon review of the unusual echo data, meteorologists F.A. Huff, H.W. Heiser, and S.G. Bigler determined that a destructive tornado had occurred in the geographical location which corresponded with the "six-shaped" echo seen on radar.

Prominent severe storm researcher Ted Fujita also documented hook echoes with various supercell thunderstorms which occurred on 9 April 1953 - the same day as the Huff et al. discovery. After detailed study of the evolution of hook echoes, Fujita hypothesized that certain strong thunderstorms may be capable of rotation.

J.R. Fulks developed the first hypothesis on the formation of hook echoes in 1962. Fulks analyzed wind velocity data from Doppler weather radar units which were installed in Central Oklahoma in 1960. Doppler data on wind velocity during thunderstorms demonstrated an association between strong horizontal wind shear and mesocyclones, which were identified as having the potential to produce tornadoes.

== Interpretation ==
Diagram of air current in a supercell

Hook echoes are a reflection of the movement of air inside and around a supercell thunderstorm. Ahead of the base of the storm, the inflow from the environment is sucked in by the instability of the air mass. As it moves upward, it cools slower than the cloud environment, because it mixes very little with it, creating an echo free tube which ends at higher levels to form a bounded weak echo region or BWER. At the same time, a mid-level flow of cool and drier air enters the thunderstorm cloud. Because it is drier than the environment, it is more dense and sinks down behind the cloud and forms the rear flank downdraft, drying the mid-level portion of the back of the cloud. The two currents form a vertical windshear, which then develops rotation and can further interact to form a mesocyclone. Tightening of the rotation near the surface may create a tornado.

A Doppler on Wheels image of a tornadic thunderstorm near La Grange, Wyoming (USA) captured during the VORTEX2 project. In the velocity image on the left, Blues/green represent winds moving towards the radar, and reds/yellows indicate winds moving away from the radar. In the reflectivity image on the right, the main body of the storm can be seen, with the appendage on the bottom of the storm being a hook echo.

Near the interaction zone at the surface, there will be a dry slot caused by the updraft on one side and the cloudy area below the rear flank downdraft on the other side. This is the source of the hook echo seen on radar near the surface. Hook echoes are thus a relatively reliable indicator of tornadic activity; however, they merely indicate the presence of a larger mesocyclone structure in the tornadic storm rather than directly detecting a tornado. During some destructive tornadoes, debris lofted from the surface may be detected as a "debris ball" on the end of the hook structure. Not all thunderstorms exhibiting hook echoes produce tornadoes, and not all tornado-producing supercells contain hook echoes.

The use of Doppler weather radar systems, such as NEXRAD, allows for the detection of strong, low-level mesocyclones that produce tornadoes even when the hook echo is not present and also grant greater certainty when a hook echo is present. By detecting hydrometeors moving toward and away from the radar location, the relative velocities of air flowing within different parts of a storm are revealed. These areas of tight rotation known as "velocity couplets" are now the primary trigger for the issuance of a tornado warning. The tornado vortex signature is an algorithm-based detection of this.

== Observational limitation ==
Hook echoes are not always obvious. Particularly in the Southern United States, thunderstorms tend to take on a structure of more precipitation surrounding a mesocyclone, which leads to the high precipitation (HP) variation supercell that obscures the hook shape. HP supercells instead often have a high reflectivity pendant or front flank notch (FFN), appearing like a "kidney bean" shape. Another limiting factor is radar resolution. Prior to 2008, NEXRAD had a range resolution of 1,000 meters, while the processes which lead to a hook echo happen on a smaller scale.

== Gallery ==
Classic hook echo of the Hackleburg-Phil Campbell EF5 tornado during the 2011 Super Outbreak.

Classic hook echo of the 2011 El Reno-Piedmont EF5 tornado undergoing a cell merger, which caused the storm to take on HP characteristics.

HP hook echo of the 2026 Bude EF3 tornado. Note the large hook relative to the FFD.

== See also ==
- Bow echo
- Bounded weak echo region
- Lemon technique
- Rear flank downdraft
- Convective storm detection
