= Hail spike =

Weather radar indicator of hail

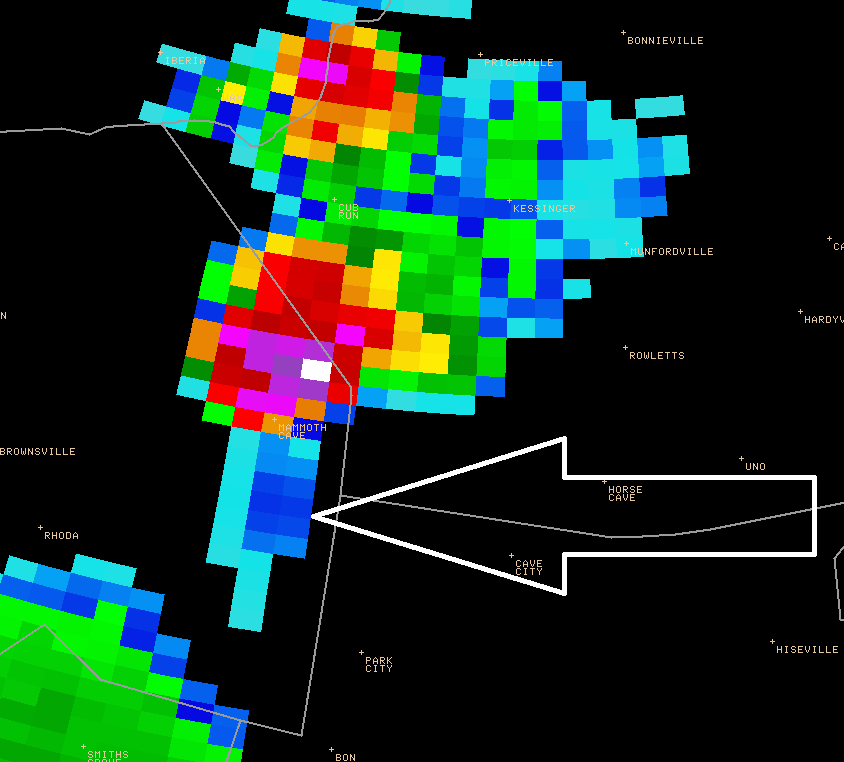
Example of a three body spike : the weak triangular echoes behind the red and white thunderstorm core (indicated by an arrow).

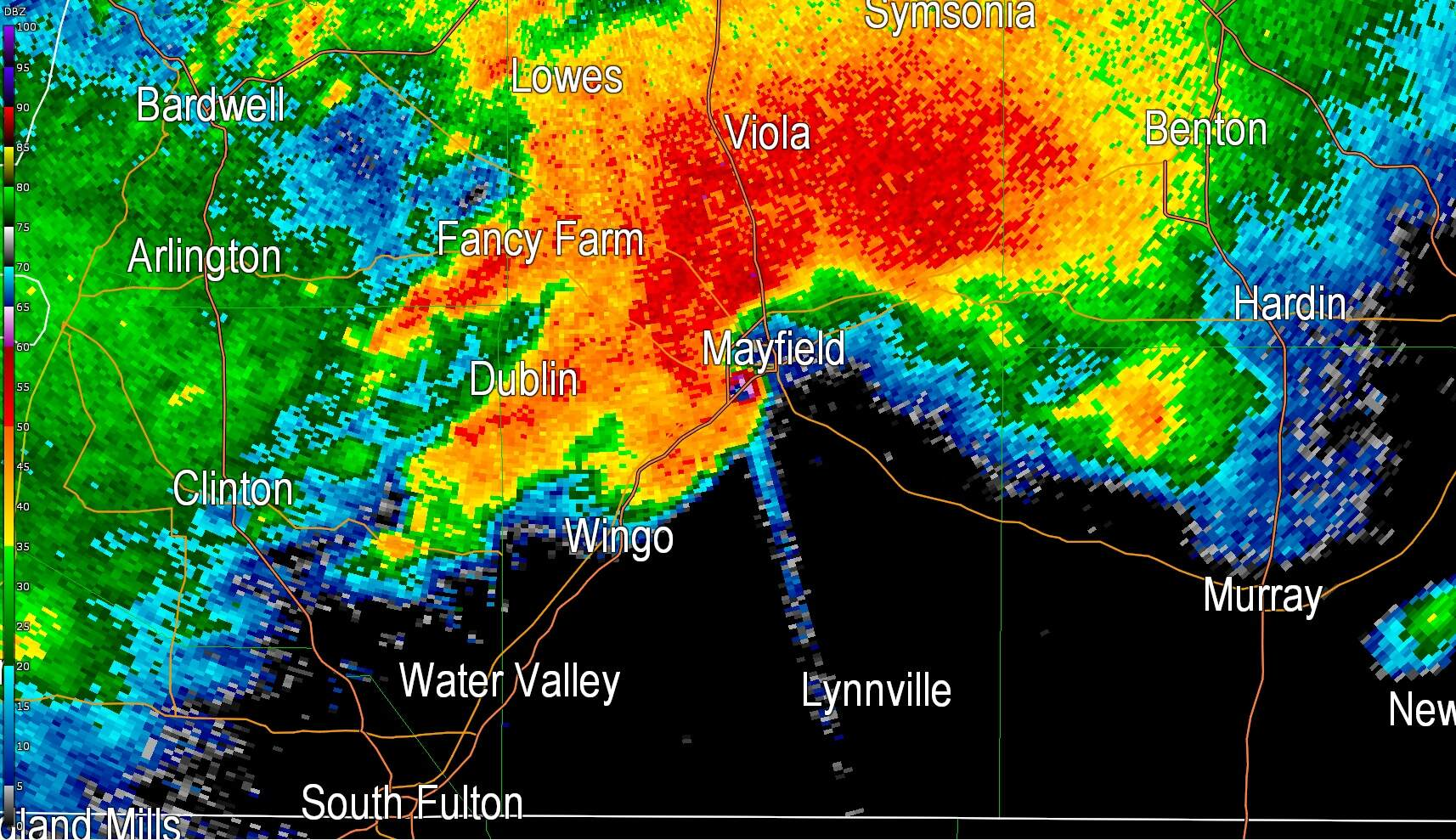
An extreme example of a three-body scatter spike caused by large debris being lofted by a large, violent tornado striking downtown Mayfield, KY on the night of December 10, 2021.

A hail spike or three body scatter spike (TBSS) is an artifact on a weather radar display indicative of large hail. They are identified by a spike of weak reflectivity echoes that extend out from a thunderstorm, and away from the radar site.

== Cause ==
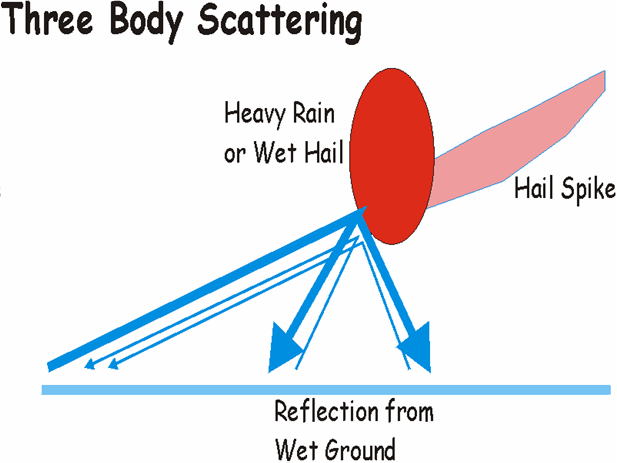
The multiple reflections of the radar beam causing the hail spike

Generally known as hail spikes, these are the result of energy from the radar hitting hail, very heavy rain, or in extreme cases, debris being lofted by a tornado, and being reflected to the ground, where they reflect back to the hail and then to the radar as in the image on the left. This results in the radar picking up the energy from the multiple path at a later time than the energy that came back directly from the hail to the radar. Both are however on the same radial angle from the radar as the antenna did not have the time to turn significantly.

The multipath echoes are then analyzed on the radar display as echoes extending in a radial direction behind the actual location of the hail/heavy rain core. The loss of energy due to multiple reflections means weaker return echoes. The hail spike region has thus comparatively quite weaker echoes than the echoes directly from the hail or heavy rain core.

Since hail cores are most intense at higher elevations, hail spikes usually appear at the levels aloft that accompany the most intense hail. Because of this, hail spikes are usually not seen at lower elevations. Another restriction to detection is that the signal of the radar beam has to do multiple reflections, each time weakening it, and are therefore usually noticeable only in extremely large hailstone cases.

== Multiple TBSS Signatures ==
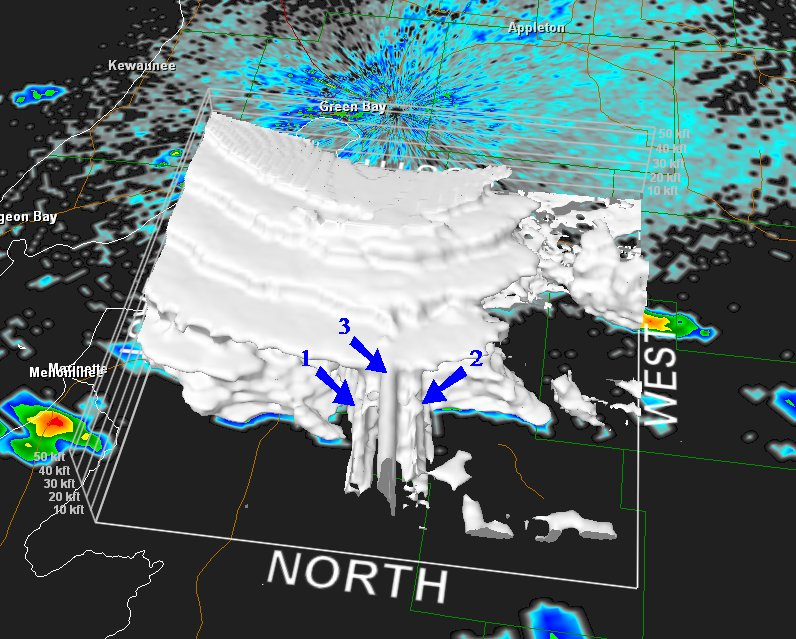
3D image showing three separate TBSS signatures in one volume scan

In rare cases more than one hail spike has been documented with a single storm in one volume scan. This indicates that more than one hail core exists in the same storm and far enough apart that each core can be sampled by the radar individually.

== Use in forecasting ==
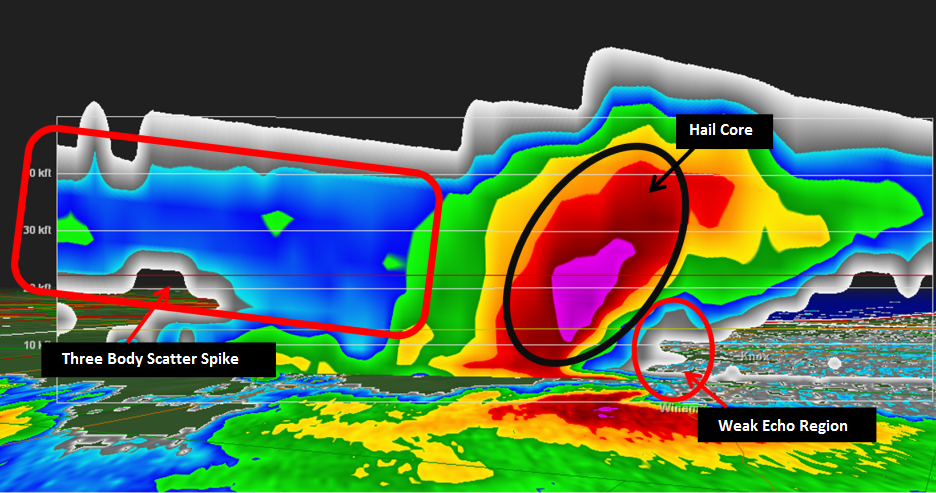
The boxed area to the left represents the cross-section of a three body spike from an anti-cyclonic thunderstorm.

Because of their observed accuracy in indicating large hail aloft, TBSS's are used operationally by the National Weather Service to identify thunderstorms that could likely produce large, severe hail. This would warrant the issuance of a severe thunderstorm warning or mention of large hail in a tornado warning.

== See also ==
- Convective storm detection
- Severe weather terminology (United States)
- Severe weather terminology (Canada)
- Tornado debris signature aka "debris spike"
