= Vertically integrated liquid =

Mass of precipitation within a cloud

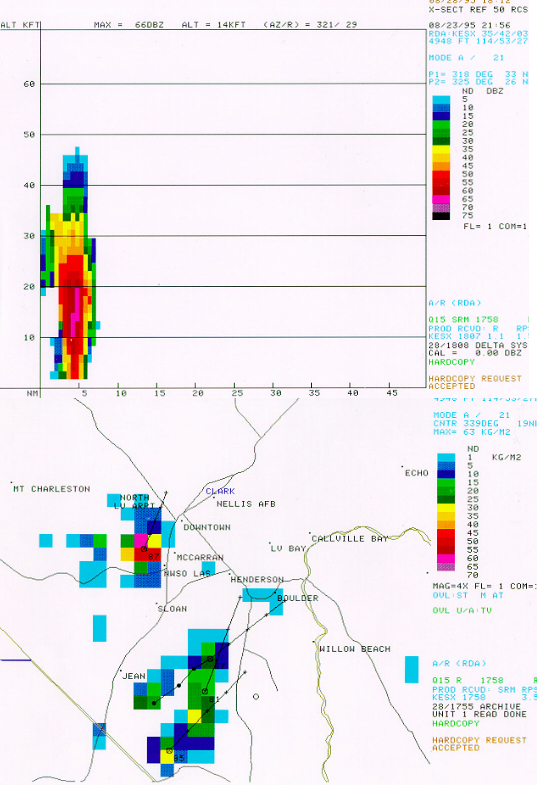
Vertical cross-section of a thunderstorm at the top and VIL value of 63 kg/m^{2} or 63 mm of rain with that cell at the bottom (red one)

Vertically integrated liquid (VIL) is an estimate of the total mass of precipitation in the clouds. The measurement is obtained by observing the reflectivity of the air which is obtained with weather radar.

== Definition ==
Reflectivity (Z) in dBZ represents the intensity of radar echoes returning from a clouds. According to the wavelengths used in weather radars, only precipitation can be noted (drizzle, rain, snow, hail), not the cloud droplets nor water vapor, so Z is proportional to the rain rate. Using the sum in the vertical of Z, one can find the total mass of water equivalent in and below the precipitating cloud and that is what is VIL.

From the studies of Marshall and Palmer on the drop size distribution of rain drops, it is possible to find VIL:

$$VIL = \sum_{i=0}^{i=i_{max}} 3.44 * 10^{-6} \left[ \left( Z_i + Z_{i+1} \right) /2 \right]^{4/7} dh \qquad \left( in\ kg / m^2 \right)$$

Where :

- Z_{i} and Z_{i+1} are reflectivities of two scanning angles and (Z_{i} + Z_{i+1})/2 is the mean value in the layer.
- dh is the thickness of the layer (in meters).

To note, the unit kg/m^{2} multiplied by water density (1 kg/liter) gives the surface accumulation in millimeters of rain: 1 kg/m^{2} = 1 mm.

== Usage ==
The VIL measurement is usually used in determining the size of prospective hail, the potential amount of rain under a thunderstorm, and the potential downdraft strength when combined with the height of the echo tops. VIL can be used to triage storms based on their severe potential. It is sometimes still used to assess storms for their potential severity.

=== Multicells ===
Multicells usually have alternating VIL values. Multicells can have high VIL values on one radar picture, yet much smaller values in the next radar picture.

=== Wet microbursts ===
When VIL values quickly fall, it might mean that a downburst is imminent. This is the result of the updraft within the cell weakening, thereby losing its ability to hold the copious amounts of moisture (including hail) within the storm's structure. Downbursts of this type are referred to as 'wet microbursts' by the National Weather Service for two reasons: (1) they contain heavy rainfall and (usually) hail; (2) they have damaging winds of greater than 58 mph (50 kn; 93 km/h). Microbursts are classified as being 'a swath of damaging winds not exceeding 2.5 miles (4.0 km) in diameter'.

Thus, wet microbursts have been sometimes mistaken for a tornado by the general public, as the damage can be quick, hard hitting, and as important or more than an EF-1 tornado. An algorithm has been developed by S. Stewart, a meteorologist for the US National Weather Service, to estimate the potential maximum gust with a descending downdraft using VIL and the Echotop on radar:

$$Maximum\ Gust= \left[ \left( 20.628571\ ms^{-2} \right) * VIL - \left( 3.125 * 10^{-6}\ s^{-2} \right) * Echotop^2 \right]^{0,5} \qquad \left( in\ m/s \right)$$

== See also ==
- Convective storm detection
