= Tornado debris signature =

Detection of tornado debris in weather radar

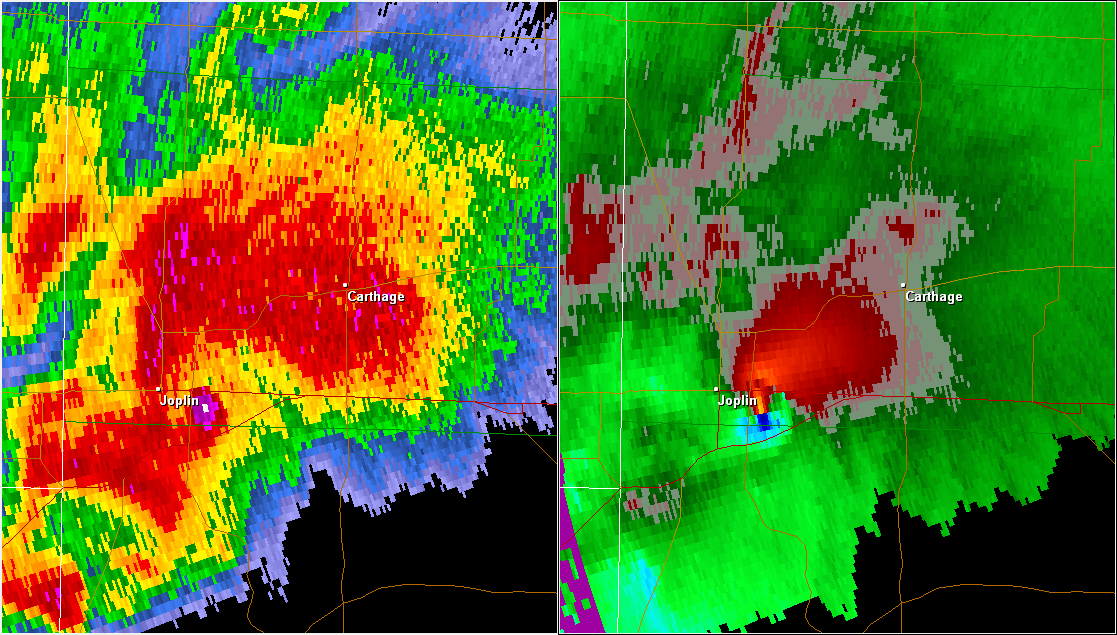
On the left, a typical debris ball shown as an area of high reflectivity on the end of the hook echo of the parent supercell of the 2011 Joplin tornado co-located with a velocity couplet on the right

A tornadic debris signature (TDS), often colloquially referred to as a debris ball, is an area of high reflectivity on weather radar caused by debris lofting into the air, usually associated with a tornado. A TDS may also be indicated by dual-polarization radar products, designated as a polarimetric tornado debris signature (PTDS). Polarimetric radar can discern meteorological and nonmeteorological hydrometeors and the co-location of a PTDS with the enhanced reflectivity of a debris ball are used by meteorologists as confirmation that a tornado is occurring.

== Overview ==
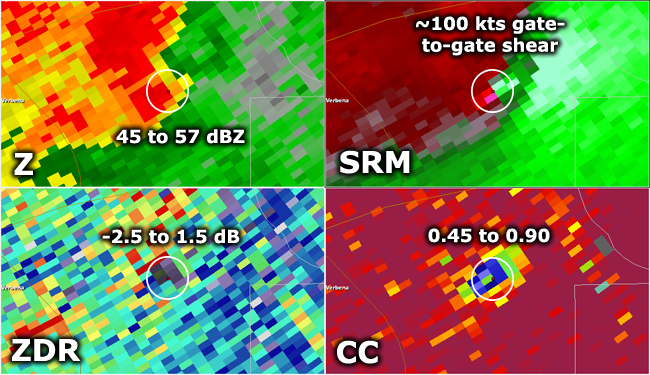
Comparison of four radar products: reflectivity, Z, top left; velocity, SRM, top right; and polarimetric products, differential reflectivity, Z_{DR}, on bottom left; correlation coefficient, CC, on bottom right, used to identify TDSs

Debris balls can be a result of anthropogenic or biomass debris and are more likely to occur if a tornado crosses a "target-rich" environment such as a forest or populated area. A TDS is most likely to be observed when a tornado is closer to a radar site and the farther away from the radar that a TDS is observed the more likely that the tornado is stronger. As a result of the strong winds required to damage structures and loft debris into the air, debris balls are normally the result of EF3 or stronger tornadoes on the Enhanced Fujita Scale. Weaker tornadoes may also not cause debris balls due to their mostly short-lived nature and thus any debris may not be sampled by radar. However, not all tornadoes meeting such strength requirements exhibit debris balls, depending on their vicinity to sources of debris and distance from the radar site. A debris ball on radar images can verify tornadoes 70–80% of the time.

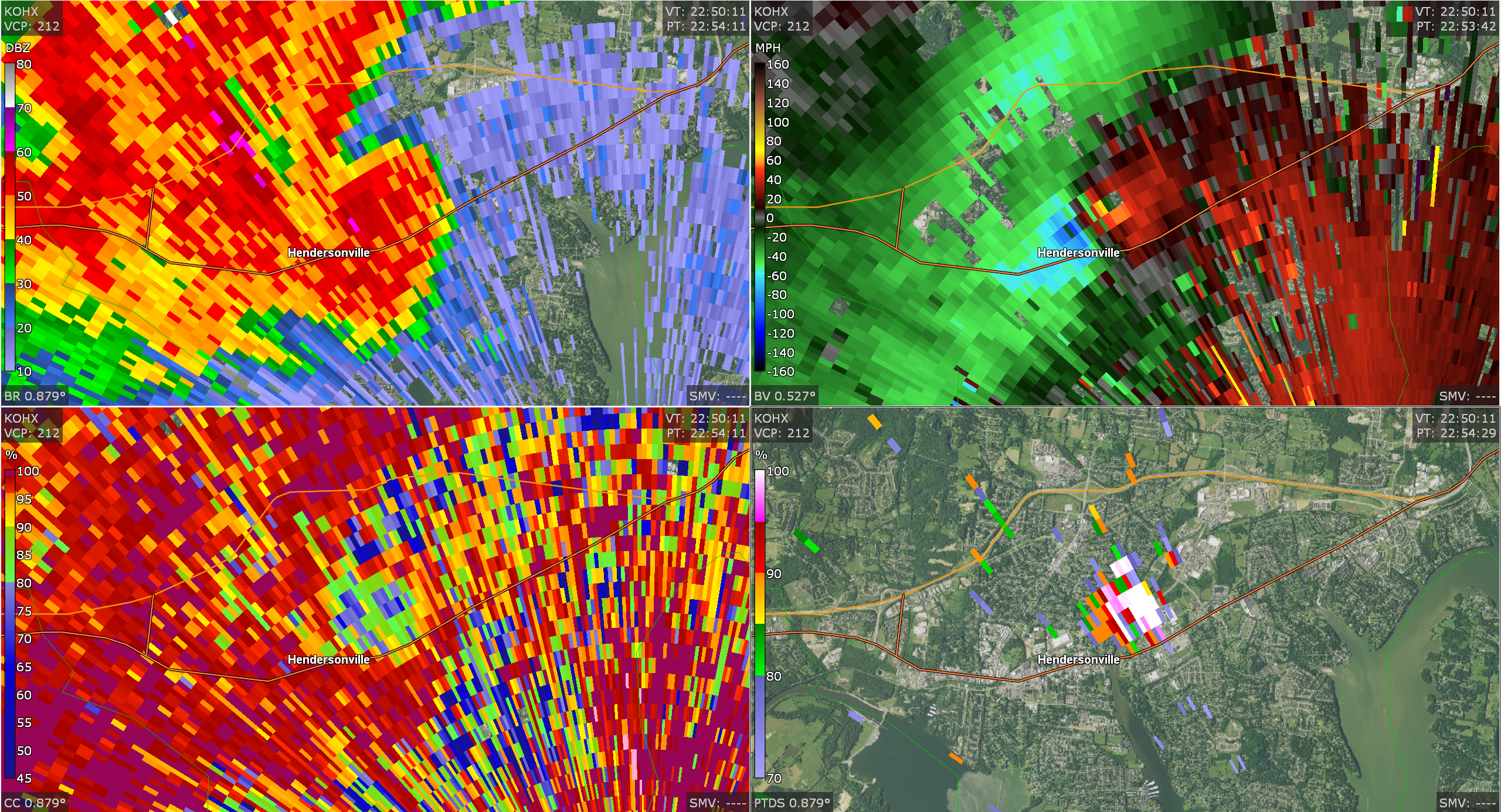
PTDS output from a tornado in Tennessee

Debris balls are seen on radar reflectivity images as a small, roundish area of high reflectivity values. Research conducted on debris balls that were noted during the 2011 Super Outbreak suggested that horizontal reflectivity from debris balls ranged from 51 to 72 dBZ during those outbreaks. Reflectivity values also decreased with increasing height. Due to the irregular and variable size, shapes, and dielectric constants of debris particles, debris balls typically produce a correlation coefficient (ρ_{hv}) less than 0.80. Differential reflectivity (Z_{DR}) values associated with debris balls are typically near or below 0 dB due to the random, tumbling nature of tornadic debris. Debris balls are almost always associated with a strong velocity couplet and the corresponding algorithm based detection, the tornado vortex signature (TVS) or tornado detection algorithm (TDA).

An algorithm, called Polarimetric Tornado Debris Signature (PTDS), was developed by researchers by combining polarimetric data with reflectivity and velocity data, showing areas with a probability of detection greater than 80%. It is used on the US National Weather Service weather radar outputs.

== See also ==
- Tornado vortex signature
- Convective storm detection
- Mesocyclone
- Debris fallout
