= Glossary of tornado terms =

The following is a glossary of tornado terminology.

== A ==
- Advanced Radar Research Center (ARRC)
- Advection
- Air parcel
- American Geophysical Union (AGU)
- American Meteorological Society (AMS)
- Anticipated convection (AC) – A convective outlook.
- Angular momentum
- Anticyclone
- Anticyclonic rotation
- Anticyclonic tornado
- Anticyclogenesis
- Arcus cloud
- Atmosphere
- Atmospheric pressure

== B ==
- Baroclinity or baroclinicity – baroclinic
- Barotropity or barotropicity – barotropic
- Bear's cage – (tornado chaser slang) The precipitation that wraps around a mesocyclone, possibly hiding a tornado on the ground.
- Beaufort scale
- Bernoulli's principle
- Blob – Informal term coined by Erik N. Rasmussen for a descending reflectivity core (DRC).
- Boundary
- Bounded weak echo region (BWER)
- Bow echo
- BRN shear
- Bulk Richardson Number (BRN)
- Bulk shear
- Buoyancy

== C ==
- Capping inversion (cap)
- Center for Analysis and Prediction of Storms (CAPS)
- Center for Severe Weather Research (CSWR)
- Chaser convention – Originally it referred to serendipitous meeting of chasers in the field akin to "chaser convergence", but now it mostly refers to the National Storm Chasers Convention Archived 2013-06-22 at the Wayback Machine held annually in the Denver, Colorado area.
- Cloud tag
- Cluster outbreak
- Cold air funnel – (colloquialism)
- Cold front
- Collar cloud
- Colorado low
- Cool air advection (CAA)
- Condensation funnel – The area of a funnel cloud or tornado where cloud has condensed. This is not the same thing as a tornado, which is a vortex of wind.
- Confluence
- Cooperative Institute for Mesoscale Meteorological Studies (CIMMS) –
- Cooperative Institute for Meteorological Satellite Studies (CIMSS)
- Cooperative Institute for Precipitation Systems (CIPS)
- Cooperative Institute for Research in the Atmosphere (CIRA)
- Convection
- Convective available potential energy (CAPE)
- Convective condensation level (CCL)
- Convective inhibition (CIN or CINh)
- Convective instability
- Convective outlook
- Convective storm
- Convective storm detection
- Convective storm prediction
- Convective temperature (CT or T_{c})
- Convergence
- Core
- Core flow region
- Core punching (or punching the core)
- Corridor outbreak
- Cumulonimbus cloud (Cb)
- Cycloidal marks
- Cyclonic rotation
- Cyclogenesis
- Cyclone – An area of cyclonic low pressure, from the scale of an extratropical or tropical cyclone to mesolow to a mesocyclone to a tornadocyclone or even to a tornado. – (slang) Historically, used in the US to a tornado.

== D ==
- Damage survey
- DAPPL database – Short for Damage Area Per Path Length, this is one of three US tornado databases and was maintained by Ted Fujita at the University of Chicago including tornadoes from 1916 to 1992.
- Debris cloud
- Deepening low
- Deep convection
- Deep shear
- Denver Convergence Vorticity Zone (DCVZ)
- Derecho
- Descending reflectivity core (DRC)
- Dew point (T_{d})
- Dew point depression
- Dewpoint surge line
- Diffluence – A pattern of wind flow in which air moves outward (in a "fan-out" pattern) away from a central axis that is oriented parallel to the general direction of the flow. It is the opposite of confluence.
- Digging low or digging wave
- Direct hit
- Directional shear
- Divergence
- Doppler on Wheels (DOW)
- Doppler weather radar
- Dry convection (or dry mixing) – A vertical exchange of air without precipitation at the ground.
- Dry line (DL)
- Dryline bulge
- Dry punch
- Dry thunderstorm
- Dust devil
- Downburst
- Downdraft

== E ==
- Earth System Research Laboratories (ESRL)
- Eddy
- Elevated mixed layer (EML)
- Energy-helicity index (EHI)
- Energy scale (E scale) – Wind speed scales proposed by Nikolai Dotzek for application to tornadoes, downbursts, tropical cyclones, other storms and wind in general.
- Enhanced Fujita scale (EF-scale)
- Enhanced wording
- Entrainment
- Environment and Climate Change Canada
- Environmental Modeling Center (EMC)
- Environmental Research Laboratories (ERL)
- Environmental Science Services Administration (ESSA) – The predecessor agency (1965–1970) to NOAA (1970–present).
- Equivalent potential temperature (theta-e)
- Extratropical cyclone
- Eye of a tropical cyclone

== F ==
- Filling low
- Fire whirl
- Forecast Decision Training Branch (FDTB)
- Forecast Systems Laboratory (FSL)
- Forward-flank downdraft (or front-flank downdraft) (FFD)
- Fractus cloud (Fr)
- Front
- Frontogenesis
- Fujita scale (F–scale)
- Funnel cloud

== G ==
- Gate-to-gate shear
- GMT (Greenwich Mean Time)
- Ground truth
- Gust front
- Gustnado

== H ==
- Handoff – (slang)
- Helicity
- High-precipitation supercell (HP)
- High-pressure area (H)
- High risk (HIGH)
- Hook echo
- Horseshoe vortex
- Hurricane

== I ==
- In situ
- Inflow
- Inflow jet
- Inflow notch
- Instability
- Intense tornado – A tornado rated F3–F5 or EF3–EF5.
- Institute for Disaster Research (IDR)

== J ==
- Jet max (or jet maximum)
- Jet streak
- Jet stream

== K ==
- Kinematics
- K-index
- Kelvin–Helmholtz instability (KH waves)

== L ==
- Landspout
- Lapse rate
- Lee trough
- Lemon technique
- Level of free convection (LFC)
- Lifted condensation level (LCL)
- Lifted index (LI)
- Lifting mechanism (lift)
- Lightning (LTG)
- Line echo wave pattern (LEWP)
- Long track tornado (LT)
- Low-precipitation supercell (LP)
- Low-pressure area (L)
- Low-topped supercell (LT)

== M ==
- Maxitornado
- Megasupercell
- Mesoanticyclone – An anticyclonic mesocyclone
- Mesoscale meteorology
- Mesocyclone
- Mesohigh
- Mesolow
- Mesonet
- Mesoscale convective complex (MCC)
- Mesoscale convective discussion (MCD)
- Mesoscale convective system (MCS)
- Mesoscale convective vortex (MCV)
- Mesoscale meteorology
- Mesovortices
- Metadata
- METAR
- Microburst
- Micronet – A weather observation network even denser than a mesonet, such as the Oklahoma City Micronet.
- Microscale meteorology
- Mini-supercell – A distinct kind of supercell that is smaller than a typical supercell. See low topped supercell.
- Mini-tornado – A fallacious term often used in European news media to refer to tornadoes occurring there; even large, strong, and/or long track tornadoes produced by supercells. This is apparently due to the erroneous perception that "real" tornadoes do not occur in Europe (or elsewhere where the term is applied).
- Misocyclone
- Misoscale meteorology
- Mixed air and mixed layer
- Mixing ratio
- Moderate risk (MDT)
- Modified Fujita scale (f scale) – A proposed update in 1992 by Ted Fujita to his original Fujita scale from 1971
- Moisture
- Moisture convergence (mcon)
- Multicellular thunderstorm
- Multiple-vortex tornado
- Multivortex mesocyclone (MVMC)

== N ==
- National Center for Atmospheric Research (NCAR)
- National Centers for Environmental Prediction (NCEP)
- National Hurricane Center (NHC)
- National Meteorological Center (NMC) – The predecessor to NCEP.
- National Oceanic and Atmospheric Administration (NOAA)
- National Science Foundation (NSF)
- National Severe Storms Forecast Center (NSSFC) – A predecessor forecasting center to SPC that was located in Kansas City, Missouri.
- National Severe Storms Laboratory (NSSL) – A NOAA lab in Norman, Oklahoma tasked with researching severe weather.
- National Tornado Database – The official NOAA record of all known tornadoes within the US from 1950 to present.
- National Weather Center (NWC)
- National Weather Service (NWS)
- National Weather Service Training Center (NWSTC)
- National Wind Institute (NWI)
- Negative area
- Negatively tilted (or negative tilt)

== O ==
- Occluded front
- Occlusion
- Overshooting top
- Outflow
- Outflow boundary

== P ==
- Particularly Dangerous Situation (PDS)
- Path length (Pl) – The distance a tornado traveled from formation to decay.
- Path width (Pw) – The diameter of the tornado vortex winds (not the condensation funnel) capable of causing damage.
- Pearson scale (or Fujita-Pearson scale) – A tornado rating scale developed by Allen Pearson differentiating path length (P) and path width (P) to accompany NOAA Fujita scale (F) ratings (F-P-P scale).
- Pendant
- Phased array radar
- Positive area
- Potential temperature ($\theta$)
- Power flash – A sudden bright light caused when an overhead power line is severed or especially when a transformer explodes. These can be caused by intense winds (or debris) from tornadoes or downbursts, but the most prominent example occurred in New York City during Hurricane Sandy when its storm surge flooded a Con Ed power plant.
- Precipitable water
- Prefrontal trough
- Pressure falls
- Pressure gradient
- Pressure gradient force (PGF)
- Pressure system
- Probe
- PROFS (Prototype Regional Observing and Forecasting Service)
- Pulse-Doppler radar
- Pulse storm

== Q ==
- Quasi-linear convective system (QLCS)

== R ==
- Radar Operations Center (ROC)
- Radius of maximum wind (RMW)
- Rain-free base (RFB)
- Rankine vortex
- Rear flank downdraft (RFD)
- Ridge
- Roll cloud
- Remote sensing
- Rope tornado
- Rossby number
- Rossby wave
- Rotation

== S ==
- Safe room
- Satellite tornado – A smaller tornado that orbits a primary tornado associated with the same mesocyclone.
- Scouring – Term used when soil and dirt is pulled from the surface after a tornado.
- Scud (Scattered Cumulus Under Deck)
- Severe local storm (SLS) – A thunderstorm presenting severe characteristics in a localized area.
- Severe Local Storms Unit (SELS) – A team of National Weather Service experts tasked with forecasting convective weather. It was eventually included as a unit within the NSSFC.
- Severe thunderstorm (svr) – A hazardous thunderstorm capable of causing injury or damage. The U.S. National Weather Service defines a severe thunderstorm as one producing 58 mph (93 km/h) or greater winds, 1 in (2.5 cm) or larger hail, or producing a funnel cloud or tornado.
- Shallow convection – Occurs when convective instability exists, but no convection occurs
- Shear – Wind shear – Winds aloft, often measured in knots.
- Shear funnel – Brief, often weak funnel generated by shear in a thunderstorm.
- Shelf cloud – Generally associated with strong thunderstorms, found along the leading edge. Horizontal and dark in appearance.
- Shortwave trough – Embedded kink within seen in overall troughing patterns.
- Significant tornado – A substantial tornado, one that is rated F2–F5 or EF2–EF5. Grazulis also includes (E)F0–(E)F1 tornadoes that cause a fatality in his definition for The Tornado Project database.
- Significant tornado parameter (STP) – Model parameter calculated using shear values, Instability values, and vorticity values.
- Skipping tornado – Often considered a Multi-vortex tornado.
- Skywarn – The storm spotting program of the US National Weather Service. Skywarn organizations have also been formed in Europe. The Canadian program is Canwarn.
- Slight risk (SLGT)
- Space Science and Engineering Center (SSEC)
- Speed shear
- Spin-up – A small, ephemeral vortex. These can refer to tornadoes spawned by quasi-linear convective systems or tropical cyclones, which occasionally become strong and fairly long track. A spin-up may sometimes refer to a landspout or gustnado (the latter of which is rarely an actual tornado).
- Splitting storm (or storm split)
- Stability index
- Stacked low
- Steam devil
- Storm chasing – Traveling with the intent to observe tornadoes and other severe weather.
- Storm interaction
- Storm merger
- Storm relative environmental helicity (SREH) or storm relative helicity (SRH)
- Storm shelter
- Storm spotting – The observation of severe weather by individuals trained in weather and reporting. Spotters can be stationary or mobile.
- Storm Data (SD) – A National Climatic Data Center (NCDC) publication beginning in 1959 detailing quality controlled tornado and other severe weather summaries as the official NOAA record of such events.
- Storm Prediction Center (SPC) – The NWS national guidance center that issues tornado, severe thunderstorm (straight-line wind and hail), and wildfire forecasts.
- Storm scale
- Storm Track (magazine) (ST) – A science and hobby magazine on storm chasing published from 1977 to 2002.
- Stovepipe tornado – (slang) Storm chaser slang for a large cylindrically shaped tornado resembling a stovepipe.
- Straight-line wind
- Streamline
- Streamwise vorticity
- Striations
- Strong tornado – A tornado rated F2–F3, EF2–EF3, T4–T7, or at least as strong as F2, EF2, T4.
- Subsidence
- Subvortex – A smaller constituent vortex within a (multiple vortex) tornado.
- Suction spot – Older term for a subvortex.
- Supercell (sup)
- Supercell composite parameter (SCP) – Model parameter calculated using Instability values, Helicity, and effective bulk wind difference.
- Supertornado – (slang) A colloquial term used to refer to a tornado achieving the maximum of some measurement, such as a F5/EF5 tornado.
- Surface weather analysis
- Surface weather observation
- Synoptic scale meteorology

== T ==
Tornado rating classifications
F0 EF0	F1 EF1	F2 EF2	F3 EF3	F4 EF4	F5 EF5
Weak		Strong		Violent
		Significant
			Intense

- Tail – (slang) A colloquial term for a tornado; most commonly used in the Southern U.S.
- Tail cloud
- Temperature
- ’’Twirly Whirly’’
- Terminal Doppler Weather Radar (TDWR)
- Thermal
- Thermodynamics
- Thunderstorm (tstm)
- The Thunderstorm Project
- Thunderstorm spectrum
- Tilted updraft
- Tornado (tor)
- Tornado Alley – A colloquial term referring to regions where tornadoes are perceived as striking more frequently than other areas. It may also be referred to as a tornado belt, especially when describing smaller areas.
- Tornado climatology – The study of geographical and temporal distribution of tornadoes and causes thereof.
- Tornado couplet – A primary cyclonic tornado and secondary anticyclonic tornado pair.
- Tornado Debris Project (TDP)
- Tornado debris signature (TDS) – A more formal term for a debris ball.
- Tornado emergency – Enhanced wording used by the U.S. National Weather Service in a tornado warning or severe weather statement when a large, intense tornado is expected to impact a highly populated area (traverse a large city or dense suburbs).
- Tornado family – A series of tornadoes spawned by successive (low-level) mesocyclones of the same supercell thunderstorm in a process known as cyclic tornadogenesis. Multiple such supercells occurring on the same day in a common region results in a corridor outbreak of tornadoes.
- Tornado fog
- Tornado Force scale (TF scale)
- Tornado Intercept Project (TIP)
- Tornado outbreak
- Tornado outbreak sequence
- Tornado preparedness
- The Tornado Project (TP) – A concerted research effort from the 1970s-1990s by Thomas P. Grazulis that compiled tornado information for risk assessment. TP published exhaustive accounts, tabulations, and analysis of all known significant tornadoes in the US from 1680 to 1995, which comprises one of three tornado databases.
- Tornado pulse
- Tornado rating – A subjective integer value assigned to a tornado differentiating its intensity (or path length or width), typically as a proxy inferred by damage analysis.
- Tornado roar
- Tornado scale
- Tornado season
- Tornado stages
- Tornado Symposium
- Tornado vortex signature (or tornadic vortex signature) (TVS)
- Tornado watch (TOA or WT) – A forecast that atmospheric conditions within a designated area are favorable for significant tornado activity over the next 1–6 hours (colloquially referred to as red box).
- Tornado warning (TOR) – A tornado is occurring or is imminent as one is sighted or is suggested by radar.
- Tornadocyclone – The parent circulation of a tornado. This may refer to a low-level mesocyclone.
- Tornadogenesis – The process leading to tornado formation.
- Tornadolysis – The process leading to tornado decay and death.
- TORRO (TORnado and storm Research Organisation)
- TORRO scale – A tornado rating scale developed by Terence Meaden of TORRO classifying tornadoes in the UK from T0-T10 based on intensity.
- TOTO (TOtable Tornado Observatory)
- Transverse rolls
- Trigger – (slang)
- Tropical cyclone (TC)
- Trough
- Tube – (slang) A storm chaser term for a tornado.
- Turbulence
- Twister – (slang) A colloquial term for a tornado. Also, a major theatrical film about storm chasing released in 1996.
- TWISTEX (Tactical Weather-Instrumented Sampling in/near Tornadoes EXperiment)

== U ==
- Updraft
- University Corporation for Atmospheric Research (UCAR)
- UTC (Coordinated Universal Time)

== V ==
- Vault
- V notch
- Velocity couplet
- Vent shear or vent wind
- Very long track tornado (VLT)
- Violent tornado – A tornado rated F4–F5, EF4–EF5, or T8–T11.
- Vortex
- Vortex breakdown
- Vortex stretching
- VORTEX projects
- Vorticity
- Vorticity maximum (vort max)
- Vorticity minimum

== W ==
- Wall cloud
- Warm air advection (WAA)
- Warm front
- Warning Decision Training Branch (WDTB)
- Waterspout
- Weak echo region (WER)
- Weak tornado – A tornado rated F0–F1, EF0–EF1, T0–T3.
- Weather map
- Weather Prediction Center (WPC)
- Weather radar
- Weather satellite
- Weather surveillance radar (WSR)
- Weatherwise – A photographically adorned general interest weather magazine that frequently publishes articles on tornadoes and other severe weather.
- Wedge tornado – (slang) Storm chaser slang for a very large tornado. Typically a wedge tornado is defined as one that is wider at ground level than it is tall (from ground to cloud base).
- Whirlwind
- Wind
- Windstorm
- Wind direction
- Wind profiler
- Wind shear
- Wind speed
- Wind Science and Engineering Research Center (WiSE)
- Winter waterspout
- World Meteorological Organization (WMO)

== Z ==
- Zulu (Z) – Zulu is a phonetic alphabet word for Z, which is an abbreviation used in timecodes to represent UTC.

== See also ==
- Glossary of meteorology
- Glossary of climate change
- Glossary of tropical cyclone terms
- List of cloud types
- List of severe weather phenomena
- List of tornadoes and tornado outbreaks
- Severe weather terminology (disambiguation)
- Tornado intensity and damage
- Tornado records
