= Denver Convergence Vorticity Zone =

Atmospheric phenomenon observed in Colorado, U.S.

The Denver Convergence Vorticity Zone (DCVZ) is an orographically-induced atmospheric phenomenon characterized by convergent winds in the High Plains just east of the Denver metropolitan area, typically 50 to 100 km (30 to 60 mi) in length and oriented in a north-south direction. This meteorological feature was subject to scientific scrutiny following a large outbreak of Denver-area tornadoes in 1981 and is implicated in the propensity of the area to spawn landspout (misocyclone) and supercell (mesocyclone) tornadoes. The DCVZ is often associated with the Denver Cyclone effect, which some consider as a more fully developed iteration of the DCVZ, although the Denver Cyclone is considered a distinct atmospheric phenomenon by some scientists.

== Characteristics ==
DCVZ conditions form when a low-level moist, southeasterly flowing air mass meets the Palmer Divide, a ridge that extends east of the Colorado Front Range. If the moist air lifts over the ridge and meets northwesterly winds originating in the Rocky Mountain foothills, winds may converge to create enhanced cyclonic vorticity. A study conducted between 1981 and 1989 demonstrated that the DCVZ formed on one-third of all days during the convective season (May through August).

DCVZ conditions are often associated with the Denver Cyclone effect, which is characterized by the formation of a large gyre near the city center.

== Role in atmospheric convection and tornado formation ==
When a DCVZ and especially Denver Cyclone develop, an otherwise capped atmosphere devoid of deep, moist atmospheric convection (e.g. thunderclouds) may break into cumulonimbus and cumulus congestus clouds. Once initiated these thunderclouds may form very rapidly. Dry microbursts and landspouts may occur in the early stages of development whereas wet microbursts and occasionally mesocyclonic tornadoes during later stages. All of these are recognized as fairly common and as hazards for Denver International Airport (DIA), both the former location at Stapleton and the newer location farther east. Various measures were adopted to identify these hazards and take action to mitigate when present.

Many studies document the role of the DCVZ in tornado outbreaks across the Denver area. Using climatic data from the 1980s, one researcher suggested that the presence of a strong June DCVZ is associated with a 70% chance of zone-area tornado formation.

== See also ==
- Climate of Colorado
- Colorado low
- Geography of Colorado
