= Misocyclone =

Concentrated, rotating column of air

- A landspout, driven by a parent misocyclone
- Area of occurrence: Every continent except Antarctica
- Cause: Horizontal wind shear, boundary layer convergence
- Effect: Nonsupercell tornadogenesis, localized wind damage

A misocyclone is a concentrated, rotating column of air measuring less than 4 kilometers (2.5 mi) in horizontal diameter. Classified within the misoscale domain of meteorology, misocyclones are physically distinct from larger, storm-scale mesocyclones. Rather than originating from a tilting supercell updraft aloft, a misocyclone typically forms in the lower troposphere or atmospheric boundary layer due to localized horizontal wind shear, thermodynamic instability, or convergence along wind boundaries.

Misocyclones serve as the primary parent vortices for non-supercell tornadoes, including landspouts, fair-weather waterspouts, and gustnadoes. When an intense convective updraft passes over a pre-existing boundary layer misocyclone, vertical stretching accelerates the rotation through the conservation of angular momentum, rapidly deepening the vortex and pulling it upward into the cloud base.

== Dynamics and formation ==
As contrasting air masses collide along a boundary layer or thunderstorm gust front, the sharp difference in horizontal wind velocity generates a narrow ribbon of intense shear that buckles under tiny fluid perturbations, rolling up into a sequence of distinct, small-scale rotational cores.

Baroclinic processes can enhance this localized rotation. Temperature and density gradients across the outflow boundary generate horizontal vorticity, which is then tilted into the vertical plane by convective updrafts near the convergence line. Once these low-level misocyclones are established, their rotation can be amplified if a developing convective cell passes directly over them; the updraft causes rapid vertical stretching, concentrating the core's angular momentum to produce non-supercell tornadoes.

== Detection ==
Because misocyclones are classified within the misoscale domain, their small physical dimensions make them significantly harder to detect on standard weather radar networks compared to storm-scale mesocyclones. On single-Doppler radar displays, a misocyclone is identified via radial velocity data as a tight pair of adjacent pixels showing maximum inbound and outbound wind velocities next to each other. This differs from mesocyclones, which have a much larger rotation and are easier to detect.
