= Wall cloud =

Cloud formation occurring at the base of a thunderstorm

Wall cloud (Murus)
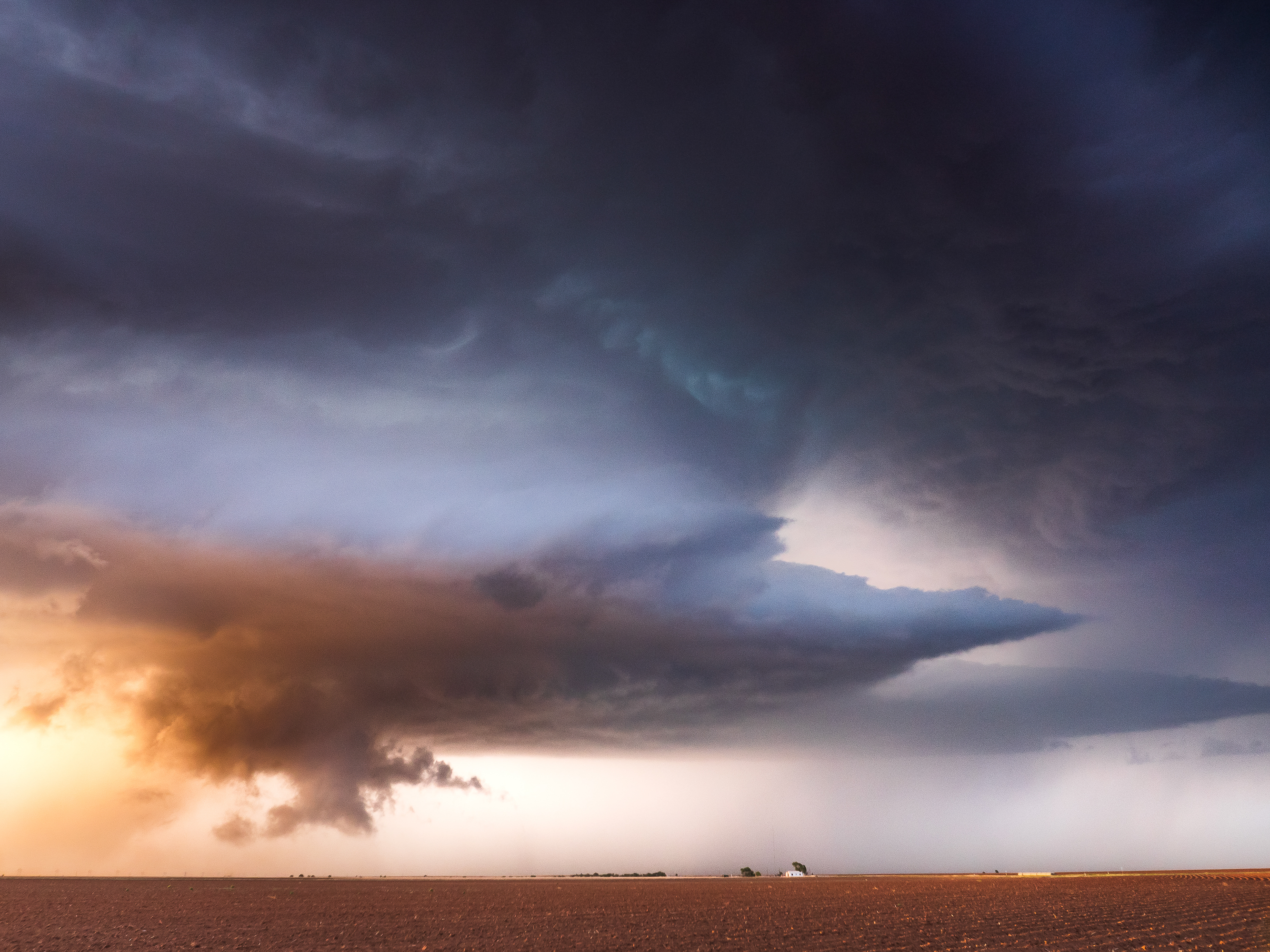
- A rain-free base with a wall cloud lowering in the foreground and precipitation in the background. Taken in Needmore, Texas.
- Abbreviation: Cb mur.
- Genus: Cumulonimbus (heap, rain)
- Species: Calvus; Capillatus
- Variety: None
- Altitude: 500-16,000 m (2,000-52,000 ft)
- Classification: Family C (Low-level)
- Appearance: A dark cloud feature that protrudes from the base of a cumulonimbus more popularly known as a wall cloud.
- Precipitation: Very common nearby, but not under : Rain, Snow, Snow pellets or Hail, heavy at times

A wall cloud (murus or pedestal cloud) is a large, localized, persistent, and often abrupt lowering of cloud that develops beneath the surrounding base of a cumulonimbus cloud and from which tornadoes sometimes form. It is typically beneath the rain-free base (RFB) portion of a thunderstorm, and indicates the area of the strongest updraft within a storm. Rotating wall clouds are an indication of a mesocyclone in a thunderstorm; most strong tornadoes form from these. Many wall clouds do rotate; however, some do not.

== Genesis ==
Position of Wall cloud under a supercell storm.

Wall clouds are formed by a process known as entrainment, when an inflow of warm, moist air rises and converges, overpowering wet, rain-cooled air from the normally downwind downdraft. As the warm air continues to entrain the cooler air, the air temperature drops, and the dew point increases (thus the dew point depression decreases). As this air continues to rise, it becomes more saturated with moisture, which results in additional cloud condensation, sometimes in the form of a wall cloud. Wall clouds may form as a descending of the cloud base or may form as rising scud comes together and connects to the storm's cloud base.

== Structure ==
Wall clouds can be anywhere from a fraction of 1 mi (1.6 km) wide to over 5 mi (8 km) across. Wall clouds form in the inflow region, on the side of the storm coinciding with the direction of the steering winds (deep layer winds through the height of the storm). In the Northern Hemisphere wall clouds typically form at the south or southwest end of a supercell. This is in the rear of the supercell near the main updraft and most supercells move in a direction with northeasterly components, for supercells forming in northwest flow situations and moving southeastward, the wall cloud may be found on the northwest or back side of such storms. Rotating wall clouds are visual evidence of a mesocyclone.

=== Associated features ===
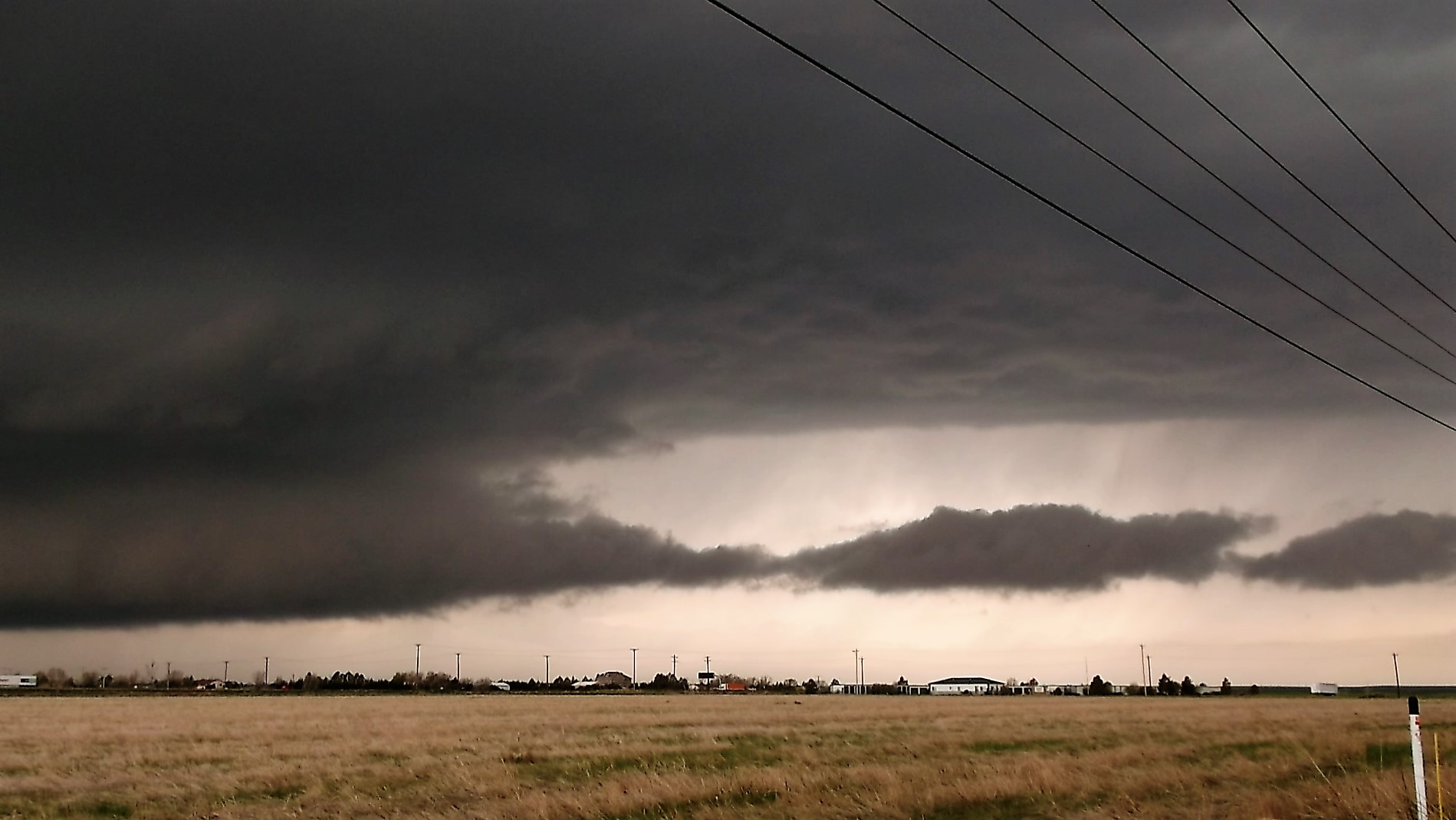
A wall cloud with tail cloud.

Some wall clouds have a feature similar to an "eye", as in a mesoscale convective vortex.

Attached to many wall clouds, especially in moist environments, is a cauda (tail cloud), a tail-like band of cloud extending from the wall cloud toward the precipitation core. It can be thought of as an extension of the wall cloud in that the tail cloud is connected to the wall cloud and condensation forms for a similar reason. Cloud elements may be seen to be moving into the wall cloud, as it is also an inflow feature. Most movement is horizontal, but some rising motion is also often apparent at the junction between the tail cloud and the wall cloud.

Some wall clouds also have a band of cloud fragments encircling the top of the wall cloud where it meets the ambient cloud base; this feature is a collar cloud.

Another accessory cloud is the flumen, commonly known as the beaver's tail. It is formed by the warm, humid inflow of a strong thunderstorm, and is often mistaken for tornadoes. Although the presence of a flumen is associated with tornado risk, the flumen does not rotate.

=== Wall cloud vs. shelf cloud ===
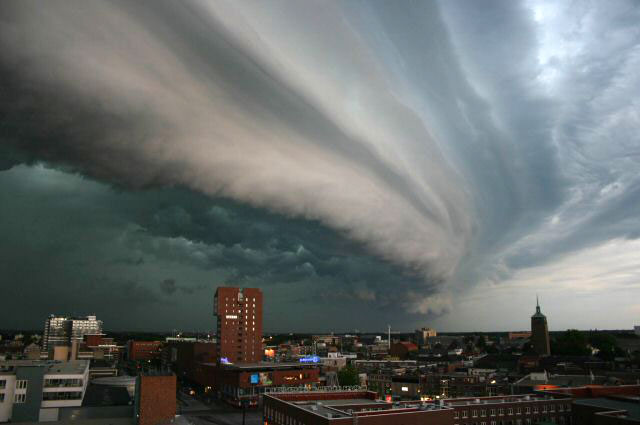
A shelf cloud over Enschede, Netherlands

Many storms contain shelf clouds, which are often mistaken for wall clouds since an approaching shelf cloud appears to form a wall made of clouds and may contain turbulent motions. Wall clouds are inflow clouds and tend to slope inward, or toward the precipitation area of a storm. Shelf clouds, on the other hand, are outflow clouds that jut outward from the storm, often as gust fronts. Also, shelf clouds tend to move outward away from the precipitation area of a storm.

Shelf clouds most often appear on the leading edge of a thunderstorm as they are formed by condensation from the cool outflow of the storm that lifts warmer air in the ambient environment (at the outflow boundary). When present in a supercell thunderstorm these shelf clouds on the leading edge of a storm are associated with the forward flank downdraft (FFD). Shelf clouds in supercells also form with the rear flank downdraft (RFD), although these tend to be more transitory and smaller than shelf clouds on the forward side of a storm. A wall cloud will usually be at the rear of the storm, though small, rotating wall clouds (a feature of a mesovortex) can occur within the leading edge (typically of a quasi-linear convective system (QLCS) or squall line) on rare occasion.

== Supercell and tornado significance ==
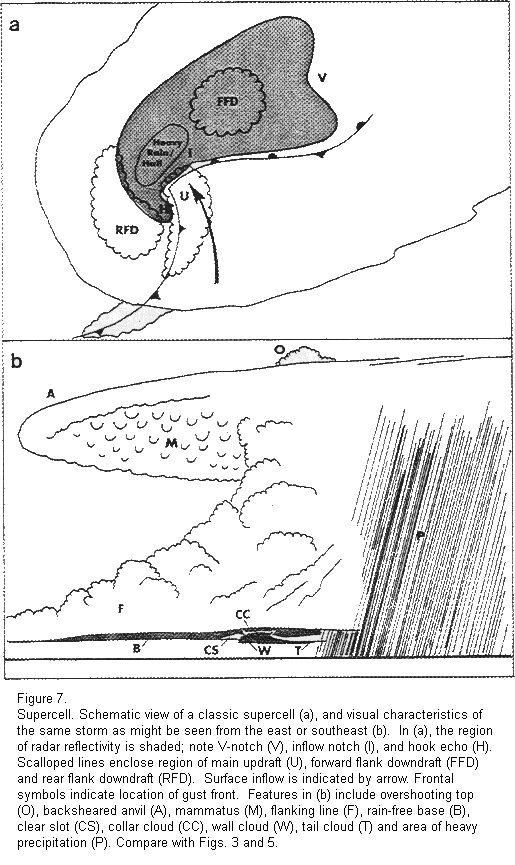
A schematic of classic supercell features. See also: LP and HP supercells

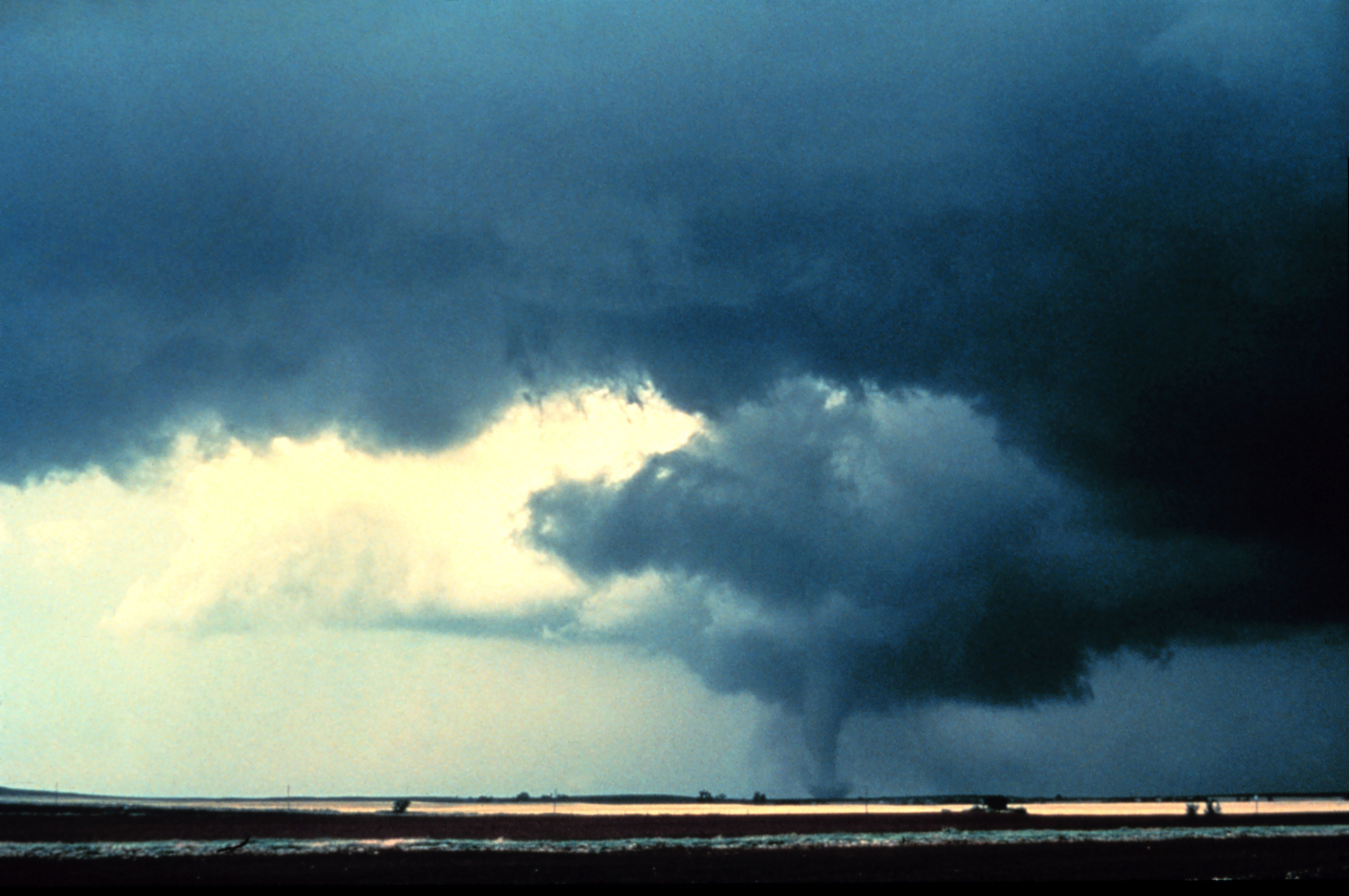
A tornadic wall cloud with RFD clear slot.

The wall cloud feature was first identified by Ted Fujita and as associated with tornadoes in tornadic storms following a detailed site investigation of the 1957 Fargo tornado. In the special case of a supercell thunderstorm, but also occasionally with intense multicellular thunderstorms such as the QLCS above, the wall cloud will often be seen to be rotating. A rotating wall cloud is the area of the thunderstorm that is most likely to produce tornadoes, and the vast majority of intense tornadoes.

Tornadogenesis is most likely when the wall cloud is persistent with rapid ascent and rotation. The wall cloud typically precedes tornadogenesis by ten to twenty minutes but may be as little as one minute or more than an hour. Often, the degree of ascent and rotation increase markedly shortly before tornadogenesis, and sometimes the wall cloud will descend and "bulk" or "tighten". Tornadic wall clouds tend to have strong, persistent, and warm inflow air. This should be sensible at the surface if one is in the inflow region; in the Northern Hemisphere, this is typically to the south and southeast of the wall cloud. Large tornadoes tend to come from larger, lower-wall clouds closer to the back of the rain curtain (providing less visual warning time to those in the path of an organized storm). Two famous examples of large tornadoes with low-wall clouds include the 2004 Hallam F4 tornado and the 2013 El Reno EF3 tornado.

Although it is rotating wall clouds that contain most strong tornadoes, many rotating wall clouds do not produce tornadoes. Absent the co-position of a low-level boundary with an updraft, tornadoes very rarely occur without a sufficiently buoyant rear flank downdraft (RFD), which usually manifests itself visually as a drying out of clouds, called a clear slot or notch. The RFD initiates the tornado, occludes around the mesocyclone, and when it wraps completely around, cuts off the inflow causing death of the low-level mesocyclone (or "tornado cyclone") and tornadolysis. Therefore, in most cases, the RFD is responsible for both the birth and the death of a tornado.

Usually, but not always, the dry slot occlusion is visible (assuming one's line of sight is not blocked by precipitation) throughout the tornado life cycle. The wall cloud withers and will often be gone by the time the tornado dissipates. If conditions are favorable, then, often even before the original tornado lifts, another wall cloud and occasionally a new tornado may form downwind of the old wall cloud, typically to the east or the southeast in the Northern Hemisphere (east or northeast in the Southern Hemisphere). This process is known as cyclic tornadogenesis and the resulting series of tornadoes as a tornado family.

The rotation of wall clouds is usually cyclonic; anticyclonic wall clouds may occur with anti-mesocyclones or with mesovortices on the leading edge of a QLCS (Again, this relationship is reversed in the Southern Hemisphere).

== Other usages of the term ==
The dense cumulonimbus cloud cover of the eyewall of an intense tropical cyclone may also be referred to as a wall cloud or eyewall cloud.

== See also ==
- Lifted condensation level (LCL)
