= Funnel cloud =

Funnel-shaped cloud not touching the ground

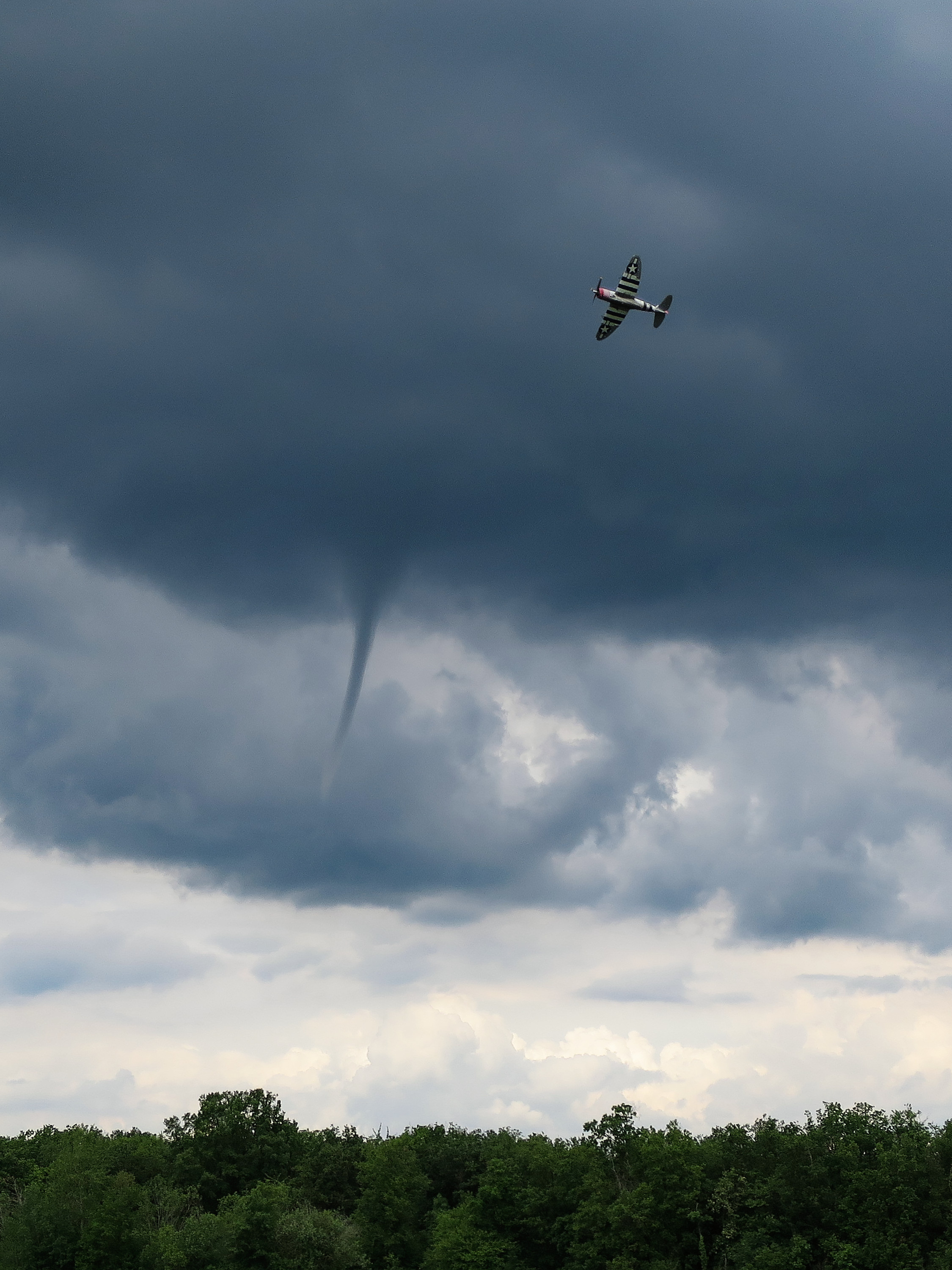
Funnel cloud during an airshow in 2024.

A funnel cloud is a funnel-shaped cloud of condensed water droplets, associated with a rotating column of wind and extending from the base of a cloud (usually a cumulonimbus or towering cumulus cloud) but not reaching the ground or a water surface. A funnel cloud is usually visible as a cone-shaped or needle like protuberance from the main cloud base. Funnel clouds form most frequently in association with supercell thunderstorms, and are often, but not always, a visual precursor to tornadoes. Funnel clouds are visual phenomena, but these are not the vortex of wind itself.

== "Classic" funnel clouds ==
If a funnel cloud touches the surface, the feature is considered a tornado, although ground level circulations begin before the visible condensation cloud appears. Most tornadoes begin as funnel clouds, but some funnel clouds do not make surface contact and these cannot be counted as tornadoes from the perspective of a naked eye observer, even as tornadic circulations of some intensity almost always are detectable when low-level radar observations are available. Also, tornadoes occur with some frequency without an associated condensation funnel. The term condensation funnel may refer to either a tornadic cloud or a funnel cloud aloft, but the term funnel cloud exclusively refers to a rotating condensation funnel not reaching the surface. If strong cyclonic winds are occurring at the surface and are connected to a cloud base, regardless of condensation, then the feature is a tornado.

Funnel clouds result from the low air pressures found within tornadoes. The low air pressure causes air flowing towards the vortex to expand and cool. If the air is sufficiently moist and cools to the dew point, a funnel cloud is produced. The air pressure around the outer edge of the funnel cloud generally corresponds to the air pressure of the cloud base of the parent cloud.

Debris swirls are usually evident prior to the condensation funnel reaching the surface. Some tornadoes may appear only as a debris swirl, with no obvious funnel cloud extending below the rotating cloud base at any time during the tornadic life cycle. The surface level vortex tends to strengthen over time following initial formation, making the debris swirls and the condensation more apparent.

In cloud nomenclature, any funnel- or inverted-funnel-shaped cloud descending from cumulus or cumulonimbus clouds is technically described as an accessory feature called tuba. The terms tuba and funnel cloud are nearly but not exactly synonymous; a wall cloud, for example, is also a form of tuba. Funnel clouds associated with supercells usually form within and under wall clouds.

== Cold-air funnel clouds ==
Cold-air funnel clouds (vortices) are generally much weaker than the vortices produced by supercells. Although cold-air funnels rarely make ground contact, surface level vortices sometimes become strong enough for a condensation cloud to "touch down" briefly, becoming visible as weak tornadoes or waterspouts.

Unlike the related phenomenon associated with severe thunderstorms, cold-air funnels are generally associated with partly cloudy skies in the wake of cold fronts, especially associated with certain low pressure systems, or in association with atmospheric boundaries such as lake and sea breezes or outflow boundaries.

The larger scale weather conditions are characterized by particularly cold air aloft over relatively warmer low level air, leading to high lapse rates, and often by high environmental vorticity yet relatively meager vertical wind shear. The funnels develop where atmospheric instability and moisture are sufficient to support towering cumulus clouds but typically limited to no precipitation. Cold-air funnels, although weak, may persist for several minutes, and areas of intermittently forming funnel clouds may occur for tens of minutes.

Multiple such areas of activity may form within the same region during afternoon heating. Cold-air funnels appears to be a diurnal phenomenon, weakening and eventually dissipating with loss of solar heating. When precipitation does develop, the associated downdraft tends to cause rapid demise of the cold-air funnels. The mixing of cooler air in the lower troposphere with air flowing in a different direction in the middle troposphere causes the rotation on a horizontal axis, which, when deflected and tightened vertically by convective updrafts, forms a vertical rotation that can cause condensation to form a funnel cloud.

Cold-air funnel clouds are a common sight along the Pacific Coast of the United States, particularly in the spring or fall.

On July 29, 2013, a cold-core funnel cloud touched down as an EF0 tornado in Ottawa, Ontario, Canada, causing extensive damage in the form of downed trees on a golf course. No advance weather watches or warnings were issued by Environment Canada, and the tornado was spawned from one of the few non-severe storm clouds moving through the area.

== Other funnel clouds ==
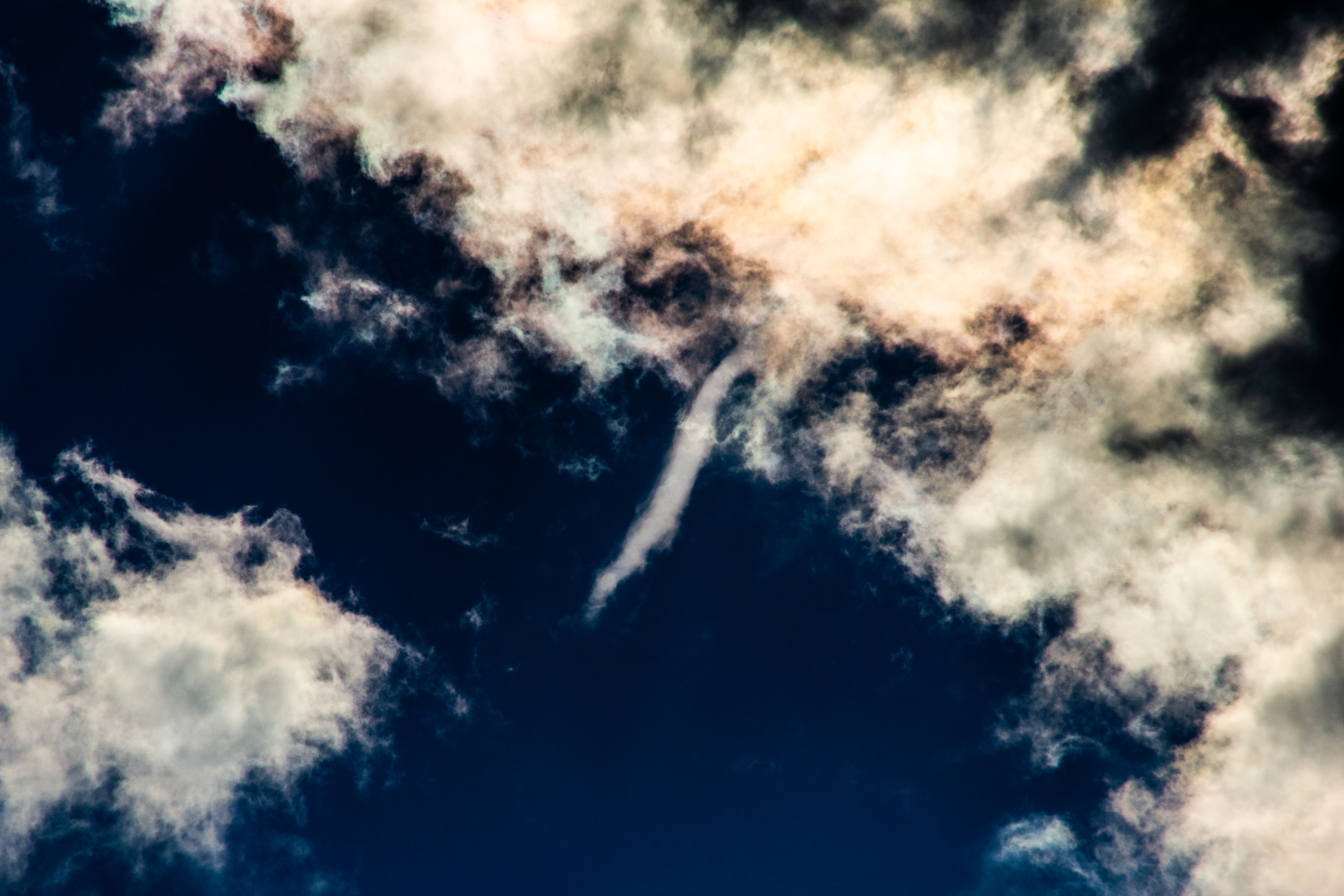
Small shear funnel in Carlyss, Louisiana

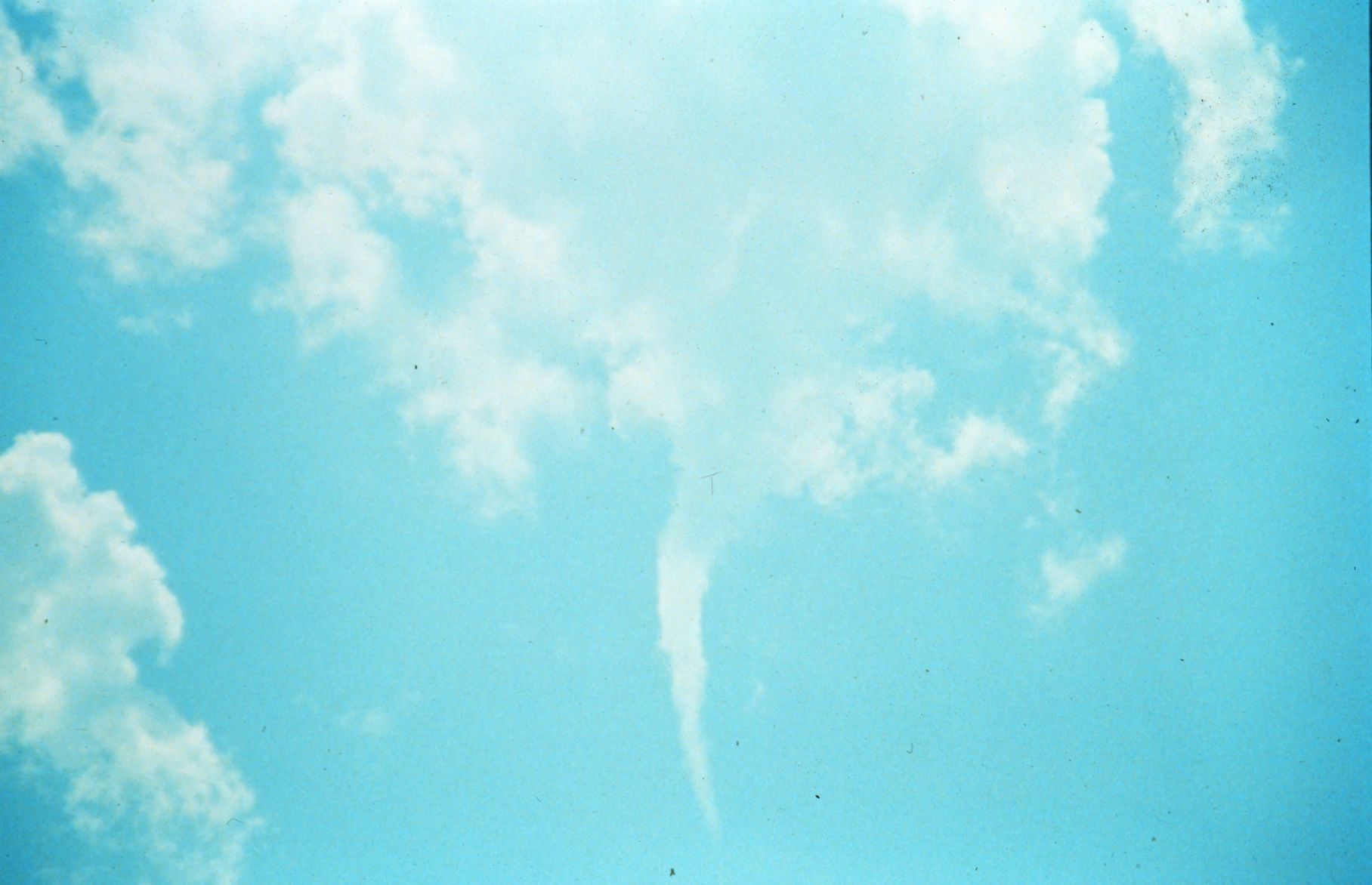
A shear funnel extending from a cumulus humilis cloud, which was observed in northern Texas during the first VORTEX project.

Other funnel clouds include shear or "high based" funnels, which are ephemeral, small, and weak funnels associated with small cumulus clouds, often even those rooted aloft above the boundary or surface layer, and in "fair weather" conditions. Small funnel clouds, such as some occurring within vicinity of mountains, occur by unknown processes.

Shear funnels might also occur with weak transient circulations at the cloud base of thunderstorms. Mesoanticyclones, which accompany mesocyclones, often exhibit these funnel clouds. Brief funnels also are observed with some rear flank downdrafts (RFDs) (within inflow or outflow areas, and especially within inflow-outflow interchange areas as RFDs interact with mesocyclones or flanking line updrafts) and streamwise vorticity currents (SVCs) feeding into mesocyclones.

Although not considered a separate kind of funnel cloud, some funnel clouds form with mesovortices associated with squall lines, which also can become tornadoes but are often not visible as funnel clouds or tornadoes because they usually occur within obscuring precipitation. Other "fair weather" funnel clouds include horseshoe clouds which are a very transient phenomena associated with extremely weak vortices.

== See also ==
- Dust devil
- Landspout
- Whirlwind
