= Glossary of tropical cyclone terms =

The following is a glossary of tropical cyclone terms.

== A ==
Advisory
Official information issued by tropical cyclone warning centers describing all tropical cyclone watches and warnings in effect along with details concerning tropical cyclone locations, intensity and movement, and precautions that should be taken. Advisories are also issued to describe: (a) tropical cyclones prior to issuance of watches and warnings and (b) subtropical cyclones.

== B ==
Bar
This is used to describe a dark layer of clouds that precedes the approach of a tropical cyclone. It is usually followed by heavy precipitation, and can also been seen in the eyewall of a cyclone. The arrival of the storm is often determined by this bar, as barometric pressure begins to fall and conditions begin to deteriorate following its passage.
Best track
A subjectively-smoothed representation of a tropical cyclone's location and intensity over its lifetime. The best track contains the cyclone's latitude, longitude, maximum sustained surface winds, and minimum sea-level pressure at 6-hourly intervals. Best track positions and intensities, which are based on a post-storm assessment of all available data, may differ from values contained in storm advisories. They also generally will not reflect the erratic motion implied by connecting individual center fix positions.

== C ==
Center
Generally speaking, the vertical axis of a tropical cyclone, usually defined by the location of minimum wind or minimum pressure. The cyclone center position can vary with altitude. In advisory products, refers to the center position at the surface.

Center / Vortex Fix
The location of the center of a tropical or subtropical cyclone obtained by reconnaissance aircraft penetration, satellite, radar, or synoptic data.

Central Dense Overcast
A dense mass of clouds that covers and eyewall or the most tightly curved inner bands of a tropical cyclone.

Central North Pacific Basin
The region north of the Equator between 140W and the International Dateline. The Central Pacific Hurricane Center (CPHC) in Honolulu, Hawaii is responsible for tracking tropical cyclones in this region.

Coriolis force
The fictitious force that causes the apparent deflection of an object that is moving in a straight line in an inertial reference frame as perceived by an observer in a rotating reference frame. The effect of this force is at its minimum at the equator and increases away from it. In the synoptic scales of the atmosphere, the Coriolis force will cause flow flowing towards a low pressure area to deflect perpendicularly to the pressure gradient driving the flow. This causes the flow to rotate cyclonically about its center, producing geostrophic flow. Tropical cyclones require a minimum distance of 500 km (310 mi) from the equator to sustain tropical cyclogenesis.

Cyclone
An atmospheric closed circulation rotating counter-clockwise in the Northern Hemisphere and clockwise in the Southern Hemisphere.

== D ==
Direct hit
A close approach of a tropical cyclone to a particular location. For locations on the left-hand side of a tropical cyclone's track (looking in the direction of motion), a direct hit occurs when the cyclone passes to within a distance equal to the cyclone's radius of maximum wind. For locations on the right-hand side of the track, a direct hit occurs when the cyclone passes to within a distance equal to twice the radius of maximum wind. Compare indirect hit, strike.

== E ==
Eastern North Pacific Basin
The portion of the North Pacific Ocean east of 140W. The National Hurricane Center in Miami, Florida is responsible for tracking tropical cyclones in this region.

Eye
The roughly circular area of comparatively light winds that encompasses the center of a severe tropical cyclone. The eye is either completely or partially surrounded by the eyewall cloud.

Eyewall / Wall Cloud
An organized band or ring of cumulonimbus clouds that surround the eye, or light-wind center of a tropical cyclone. Eyewall and wall cloud are used synonymously.

Extratropical
A term used in advisories and tropical summaries to indicate that a cyclone has lost its "tropical" characteristics. The term implies both poleward displacement of the cyclone and the conversion of the cyclone's primary energy source from the release of latent heat of condensation to baroclinic (the temperature contrast between warm and cold air masses) processes. Cyclones can become extratropical and still retain winds of hurricane or tropical storm force.

Extratropical cyclone
A cyclone of any intensity for which the primary energy source is baroclinic, that is, results from the temperature contrast between warm and cold air masses.

== F ==
Fujiwhara effect
The tendency of two nearby tropical cyclones to rotate cyclonically about each other.

== G ==
Gale Warning
A warning of 1-minute or 10-minute sustained surface winds in the range 34 kn (39 mph or 63 km/h) to 47 kn (54 mph or 87 km/h) inclusive, either predicted or occurring and not directly associated with tropical cyclones.

== H ==
High Wind Warning
A high wind warning is defined as 1-minute average surface winds of 35 kn (40 mph or 64 km/h) or greater lasting for 1 hour or longer, or winds gusting to 50 kn (58 mph or 93 km/h) or greater regardless of duration that are either expected or observed over land.

HURDAT
The short name for the Hurricane Database, the database for all tropical cyclones in the Atlantic Ocean, Gulf of Mexico, and Caribbean Sea since 1851, and the Northeast Pacific Ocean since 1949.

Hurricane / Typhoon
A tropical cyclone in which the maximum sustained surface wind (using the U.S. 1-minute average) is 64 kn (74 mph or 119 km/h) or more. The term hurricane is used for Northern Hemisphere tropical cyclones east of the International Dateline to the Greenwich Meridian. The term typhoon is used for Pacific tropical cyclones north of the Equator west of the International Dateline.

Hurricane Local Statement
A public release prepared by local National Weather Service offices in or near a threatened area giving specific details for its county/parish warning area on (1) weather conditions, (2) evacuation decisions made by local officials, and (3) other precautions necessary to protect life and property.

Hurricane Season
The portion of the year having a relatively high incidence of hurricanes. The hurricane season in the Atlantic, Caribbean, and Gulf of Mexico runs from June 1 to November 30. The hurricane season in the Eastern Pacific basin runs from May 15 to November 30. The hurricane season in the Central Pacific basin runs from June 1 to November 30.

Hurricane Warning
An announcement that hurricane conditions (sustained winds of 74 mph or higher) are expected somewhere within the specified coastal area. Because hurricane preparedness activities become difficult once winds reach tropical storm force, the hurricane warning is issued 36 hours in advance of the anticipated onset of tropical-storm-force winds.

Hurricane Watch
An announcement that hurricane conditions (sustained winds of 74 mph or higher) are possible within the specified coastal area. Because hurricane preparedness activities become difficult once winds reach tropical storm force, the hurricane watch is issued 48 hours in advance of the anticipated onset of tropical-storm-force winds.

Hypercane
A hypothetical tropical cyclone that could potentially form over 50 °C (122 °F) water. Such a storm would produce winds of over 800 km/h (500 mph). A series of hypercanes may have formed during the asteroid or comet impact that killed the non-avian dinosaurs 66 million years ago. Such a phenomenon could also occur during a supervolcanic eruption, or extreme global warming.

== I ==
Indirect Hit
Generally refers to locations that do not experience a direct hit from a tropical cyclone, but do experience hurricane-force winds (either sustained or gusts) or tides of at least 4 feet above normal.

Inland Tropical Storm Warning
The equivalent of a Tropical Storm Warning for inland counties, put into use after multiple Tornado Warnings were issued for Hurricane Katrina, when tornadoes were not present, but winds were the equivalent of EF0-2 tornadoes. These are issued by local NWS forecast offices, not the NHC.

Inland Hurricane Warning
The equivalent of a Hurricane Warning for inland counties, put into use after multiple Tornado Warnings were issued for Hurricane Katrina, when tornadoes were not present, but winds were the equivalent of EF0-2 tornadoes. These are issued by local NWS forecast offices, not the NHC.

Intertropical Convergence Zone
A zonally elongated axis of surface wind confluence of northeasterly and southeasterly trade winds in the tropics.

Inundation
The flooding of normally dry land, primarily caused by severe weather events along the coasts, estuaries, and adjoining rivers. These storms, which include hurricanes and nor'easters, bring strong winds and heavy rains. The winds drive large waves and storm surge on shore, and heavy rains raise rivers. (A tsunami — a giant wave caused by earthquakes or volcanic eruptions under the sea or landslides into the sea — is another kind of coastal inundation, but should not be confused with storm surge).

Invest
A weather system for which a tropical cyclone forecast center (NHC, CPHC, or JTWC) is interested in collecting specialized data sets (e.g., microwave imagery) and/or running model guidance. Once a system has been designated as an invest, data collection and processing is initiated on a number of government and academic web sites, including the Naval Research Laboratory (NRL) and the University of Wisconsin Cooperative Institute for Meteorological Satellite Studies (UW-CIMSS). The designation of a system as an invest does not correspond to any particular likelihood of development of the system into a tropical cyclone; operational products such as Tropical Weather Outlooks or Significant Tropical Weather Advisories should be consulted for this purpose.

== K ==
Kelvin wave
An eastward moving atmospheric wave that can enhance deep convection and contribute to tropical cyclogenesis, especially over the Pacific Ocean. It moves towards the east at about 10° to 20° longitude per day.

== L ==
Landfall
The intersection of the surface center of a tropical cyclone with a coastline. Because the strongest winds in a tropical cyclone are not located precisely at the center, it is possible for a cyclone's strongest winds to be experienced over land even if landfall does not occur. Similarly, it is possible for a tropical cyclone to make landfall and have its strongest winds remain over the water. Compare direct hit, indirect hit, and strike.

== M ==
Major hurricane
A designation used by the National Hurricane Center reserved for hurricanes in the Atlantic or Northeast Pacific basins that achieve Category 3 in the Saffir–Simpson Hurricane Scale. These storms have winds of at least 96 knots (178 km/h; 110 mph).

Maximum Sustained Surface Wind
The standard measure of a tropical cyclone's intensity. When the term is applied to a particular weather system, it refers to the highest one-minute average wind (at an elevation of 10 meters with an unobstructed exposure) associated with that weather system at a particular point in time.

Monsoon
A large-scale, seasonally-reversing surface wind circulation in the tropics accompanied by large amplitude seasonal changes in precipitation.

Monsoon trough
A surface trough in association with a monsoon circulation. This is depicted by a line on a weather map showing the location of minimum sea level pressure coinciding with the maximum cyclonic turning of the surface winds, with southwesterly or northwesterly flow prevailing equatorward and northeasterly flow prevailing poleward of the typically zonally oriented trough axis.

== O ==
Outflow
Air that flows outwards from a storm system; associated with ridging, or anticyclonic flow. Low-level outflow boundaries from mesoscale convective complexes can disrupt the center of small tropical cyclones. However, outflow aloft is essential for the strengthening of a tropical cyclone. If this outflow is undercut, the tropical cyclone weakens. If two tropical cyclones are in proximity, the upper-level outflow from the system to the west can limit the development of the system to the east.

== P ==
The Philippine Area of Responsibility (red), Tropical Cyclone Advisory Domain (orange), and Tropical Cyclone Information Domain (purple)

Philippine Area of Responsibility
An area bounded by rhumb lines on the Philippine Tropical Cyclone Tracking Chart/Map or imaginary lines on the surface of the earth that makes equal oblique angles with all meridians joining the following points: 25°N 120°E, 25°N 135°E, 5°N 135°E, 5°N 115°E, 15°N 115°E, and 21°N 120°E. Tropical cyclone bulletins are issued by the Philippine Atmospheric, Geophysical and Astronomical Services Administration (PAGASA) every three, six, or twelve hours for all tropical cyclones within this area, depending on the cyclone's current threat to land or intensity.

Post-storm Report
A report issued by a US National Weather Service office summarizing the impact of a tropical cyclone on its forecast area. These reports include information on observed winds, pressures, storm surges, rainfall, tornadoes, damage and casualties.

Post-tropical cyclone
A cyclone that no longer possesses sufficient tropical characteristics to be considered a tropical cyclone. Post-tropical cyclones can continue carrying heavy rains and high winds. Note that former tropical cyclones that have become fully extratropical as well as remnant lows are two classes of post-tropical cyclones.

Potential tropical cyclone
At the start of the 2017 season, the NHC changed their internal policy to allow advisories and thus tropical cyclone watches and warnings to be issued for tropical disturbances that do not yet satisfy the definition of a tropical cyclone, but have a high chance at becoming one, and pose the threat of tropical storm-force winds to landmasses within 48 hours. These systems are designated as "Potential Tropical Cyclones". In 2025, lead time was increased up to 72 hours.

Preliminary Report
Now known as the "Tropical Cyclone Report". A report summarizing the life history and effects of an Atlantic or eastern Pacific tropical cyclone. It contains a summary of the cyclone life cycle and pertinent meteorological data, including the post-analysis best track (six-hourly positions and intensities) and other meteorological statistics. It also contains a description of damage and casualties the system produced, as well as information on forecasts and warnings associated with the cyclone. NHC writes a report on every tropical cyclone in its area of responsibility.

Present Movement
The best estimate of the movement of the center of a tropical cyclone at a given time and given position. This estimate does not reflect the short-period, small scale oscillations of the cyclone center.

== R ==
Radius of maximum wind
The distance from the center of a tropical cyclone to the location of the cyclone's maximum winds. In well-developed hurricanes, the radius of maximum winds is generally found at the inner edge of the eyewall.

Radius of outermost closed isobar (ROCI)

One of the quantities used to determine the size of a tropical cyclone. The ROCI is determined by measuring the radii from the center of the storm to its outermost closed isobar in four quadrants, which is then averaged to come up with a scalar value. It generally delimits the outermost extent of a tropical cyclone's wind circulation.

Rapid intensification
An increase in the maximum sustained winds of a tropical cyclone of at least 30 kn in a 24-h period.

Relocated
A term used in an advisory to indicate that a vector drawn from the preceding advisory position to the latest known position is not necessarily a reasonable representation of the cyclone's movement.

Reformed
A term used in an advisory to indicate that the center of a tropical cyclone, usually weak, has dissipated and a new center has formed at a different location. This will sometimes lead to an incorrect representation of movement. The center of a cyclone can reform multiple times in its life. The new center is not given a new name from the rotating name lists, unless there is a period of time between old center dissipation and new center reformation.

Remnant Low
A post-tropical cyclone that no longer possesses the convective organization required of a tropical cyclone...and has maximum sustained winds of less than 34 knots. The term is most commonly applied to the nearly deep-convection-free swirls of stratocumulus in the eastern North Pacific.

== S ==
Saffir–Simpson scale, 1-minute maximum sustained winds
Category	m/s	knots	mph	km/h
5	≥ 70	≥ 137	≥ 157	≥ 252
4	58–70	113–136	130–156	209–251
3	50–58	96–112	111–129	178–208
2	43–49	83–95	96–110	154–177
1	33–42	64–82	74–95	119–153
TS	18–32	34–63	39–73	63–118
TD	≤ 17	≤ 33	≤ 38	≤ 62

Saffir-Simpson Hurricane Scale/Saffir-Simpson Hurricane Wind Scale (SSHWS)
The Saffir-Simpson Hurricane Wind Scale is a 1 to 5 categorization based on the hurricane's intensity at the indicated time. The scale provides examples of the type of damage and impacts in the United States associated with winds of the indicated intensity.

Sea surface temperature
Water temperature close to the surface of a large body of water, such as an ocean or sea. Normally, an ocean temperature of 26.5 °C (79.7 °F) spanning through at least a 50-metre depth is one of the six requirements needed to maintain the special mesocyclone that is the tropical cyclone. These warm waters are needed to maintain the warm core that fuels tropical systems.

Severe Tropical Cyclone
A term used by RSMC Nadi and the Tropical Cyclone Warning Centers in Perth, Darwin, Jakarta, Port Moresby and Wellington to describe an Australian category 3, 4 or 5 tropical cyclone that has wind speeds greater than 120 km/h (75 mph).

Severe Tropical Storm
A term used by the Japan Meteorological Agency to describe a typhoon with 10-minute windspeeds between 88–117 km/h (55–73 mph).

Storm surge
An abnormal rise in sea level accompanying a hurricane or other intense storm, and whose height is the difference between the observed level of the sea surface and the level that would have occurred in the absence of the cyclone. Storm surge is usually estimated by subtracting the normal or astronomic high tide from the observed storm tide.

Storm Surge Warning
The danger of life-threatening inundation from rising water moving inland from the shoreline somewhere within the specified area, generally within 36 hours, in association with an ongoing or potential tropical cyclones, a subtropical cyclone or a post-tropical cyclone. The warning may be issued earlier when other conditions, such as the onset of tropical-storm-force winds are expected to limit the time available to take protective actions for surge (e.g., evacuations). The warning may also be issued for locations not expected to receive life-threatening inundation but which could potentially be isolated by inundation in adjacent areas.

Storm Surge Watch
The possibility of life-threatening inundation from rising water moving inland from the shoreline somewhere within the specified area, generally within 48 hours, in association with an ongoing or potential tropical cyclones, a subtropical cyclone or a post-tropical cyclone. The watch may be issued earlier when other conditions, such as the onset of tropical-storm-force winds are expected to limit the time available to take protective actions for surge (e.g., evacuations). The warning may also be issued for locations not expected to receive life-threatening inundation but which could potentially be isolated by inundation in adjacent areas.

Storm tide
The actual level of sea water resulting from the astronomic tide combined with the storm surge.

Storm Warning
A warning of 1-minute sustained surface winds of 48 kn (55 mph or 88 km/h) or greater, either predicted or occurring, not directly associated with tropical cyclones.

Strike
strike zone diagram For any particular location, a hurricane strike occurs if that location passes within the hurricane's strike circle, a circle of 125 nmi diameter, centered 12.5 nmi to the right of the hurricane center (looking in the direction of motion). This circle is meant to depict the typical extent of hurricane-force winds, which are approximately 75 nmi to the right of the center and 50 nmi to the left.

Subtropical cyclone
A non-frontal low pressure system that has characteristics of both tropical and extratropical cyclones. This system is typically an upper-level cold low with circulation extending to the surface layer and maximum sustained winds generally occurring at a radius of about 100 miles or more from the center. In comparison to tropical cyclones, such systems have a relatively broad zone of maximum winds that is located farther from the center, and typically have a less symmetric wind field and distribution of convection.

Subtropical Depression
(Atlantic/Eastern Pacific Ocean) - A subtropical cyclone in which the maximum sustained surface wind speed is 33 kn (38 mph or 62 km/h) or less.

Subtropical Storm
A subtropical cyclone in which the maximum sustained surface wind speed (using the U.S. 1-minute average) is 34 kn (39 mph or 63 km/h) or more.

Super Typhoon (CMA)
A term used by the China Meteorological Administration to describe a typhoon in the Western Pacific that has sustained windspeeds greater than over a 3-minute period

Super Typhoon (HKO)
A term used by the Hong Kong Observatory to describe a typhoon in the Western Pacific that has sustained windspeeds greater than over a 10-minute period

Super Typhoon (JTWC)
A term used by the Joint Typhoon Warning Center in the Western Pacific to describe a typhoon that has sustained windspeeds greater than 130 knots over a 1-minute period.

Super Typhoon (PAGASA)
A term used unofficially by PAGASA in the Western Pacific for tropical cyclones with 10-minute sustained winds of more than 185 km/h (115 mph).

Synoptic Track
Weather reconnaissance mission flown to provide vital meteorological information in data sparse ocean areas as a supplement to existing surface, radar, and satellite data. Synoptic flights better define the upper atmosphere and aid in the prediction of tropical cyclone development and movement.

== T ==
Tropical cyclogenesis
The development and strengthening of a tropical cyclone in the atmosphere. Tropical cyclogenesis involves the development of a warm-core cyclone, due to significant convection in a favorable atmospheric environment. There are six main requirements for tropical cyclogenesis: sufficiently warm sea surface temperatures, atmospheric instability, high humidity in the lower to middle levels of the troposphere, enough Coriolis force to develop a low pressure center, a preexisting low level focus or disturbance, and low vertical wind shear.

Tropical cyclone
A warm-core non-frontal synoptic-scale cyclone, originating over tropical or subtropical waters, with organized deep convection and a closed surface wind circulation about a well-defined center. Once formed, a tropical cyclone is maintained by the extraction of heat energy from the ocean at high temperature and heat export at the low temperatures of the upper troposphere. In this they differ from extratropical cyclones, which derive their energy from horizontal temperature contrasts in the atmosphere (baroclinic effects).

Tropical cyclone (Southwest Indian Ocean)
A tropical system in which the 10-minute maximum sustained winds are between 64–89 knots (74–102 mph; 119–165 km/h).

Tropical depression
A tropical cyclone in which the maximum sustained surface wind speed (using the U.S. 1-minute average) is 33 kn (38 mph or 62 km/h) or less.

Tropical disturbance
A discrete tropical weather system of ostensibly organized convection—generally 100 to 300 nmi in diameter—originating in the tropics or subtropics, having a non-frontal migratory character, and maintaining its identity for 24 hours or more. It may or may not be associated with a detectable perturbation of the wind field.

Tropical storm
A tropical cyclone in which the maximum sustained surface wind speed (using the U.S. 1-minute average) ranges from 34 kn (39 mph or 63 km/h) to 63 kn (73 mph or 118 km/h).

Tropical Storm Warning
An announcement that tropical storm conditions (sustained winds of 39 to 73 mph) are expected somewhere within the specified coastal area within 36 hours.

Tropical Storm Watch
An announcement that tropical storm conditions (sustained winds of 39 to 73 mph) are possible within the specified coastal area within 48 hours.

Tropical wave
A trough or cyclonic curvature maximum in the trade-wind easterlies. The wave may reach maximum amplitude in the lower middle troposphere.

Tropical Weather Outlook (TWO)
An official forecast by the National Hurricane Center highlighting the probability of a tropical cyclone developing.

Typhoon
A tropical cyclone with winds exceeding 74 mph (119 km/h) in the western Pacific Ocean, the equivalent of a hurricane

== W ==
Western North Pacific Basin
The portion of the North Pacific Ocean from 100E to 180E. The Joint Typhoon Warning Center in Pearl Harbor, Hawaii, PAGASA and the Japan Meteorological Agency are responsible for tracking tropical cyclones in this region.

== See also ==
- Glossary of climate change
- Glossary of meteorology
- Glossary of tornado terms
