= Dry line =

Boundary between moist and dry air

Idealized depiction of where a dryline is located around an extratropical cyclone

A dry line (also called a dew point line, or Marfa front, after Marfa, Texas) is a line across a continent that separates moist air and dry air. One of the most prominent examples of such a separation occurs in central North America, especially Texas, Oklahoma, and Kansas, where the moist air from the Gulf of Mexico meets dry air from the desert south-western states. The dry line is an important factor in severe weather frequency in the Great Plains of North America. It typically lies north-south across the High Plains states in the warm sector of an extratropical cyclone and stretches into the Canadian Prairies during the spring and early summer. The dry line is also important for severe convective storms in other regions of the world, such as northern India and Southern Africa. In general, thunderstorms and other forms of severe weather occur on the moist side of the dryline.

== Characteristics ==
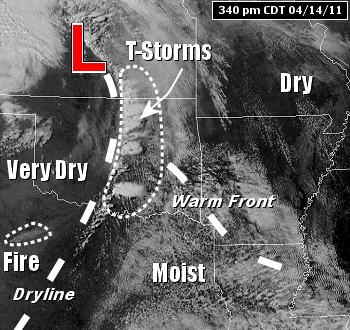
Satellite view of severe thunderstorms developing along the dry line.

Near the surface, warm dry air is denser than warm moist air of lesser or similar temperature, and thus the warm dry air wedges under the moist air like a cold front. At higher altitudes, the warm moist air is less dense than the cooler, drier air and the boundary slope reverses. In the vicinity of the reversal aloft, severe weather is possible, especially when a triple point is formed with a cold front. The dry line is most common in the spring. Its location is close to the location of the 55 °F (13 °C) isodrosotherm, or line of equal dewpoint. The location of the dryline may not be marked with a surface pressure trough or shift of the wind direction. It bulges more to the east underneath the location of the highest winds within the jet stream. While dry lines are most common in the Great Plains, northern India also witnesses a similar moisture boundary. In northeast India, it occurs mainly before the onset of their summer monsoon, while northwest India experiences it during the monsoon season.

=== Dry punch ===
A dry punch is meteorological slang for a synoptic scale or mesoscale process. A dry punch at the surface results in a dry line bulge. A dry punch aloft above an area of warm, moist (buoyant) air at low levels often increases the potential for severe thunderstorms.

== Daily progression in North America ==
The dry line typically advances eastward during the afternoon and retreats westward at night, mainly due to the increased mixing down to the surface of dry air aloft, rather than the surface density contrast between the air masses. As vertical mixing ceases after sunset, the southeasterly winds in the moist sector typically transport the moist air back westward. The eastward movement of the dry line during daylight hours is quickest in areas where low level moisture is most shallow, as dryline movement slows in areas with deeper low-level moisture. Weaker winds aloft also slow its progression. However, a strong storm system can sweep the dry line eastward into the Mississippi Valley or Texas/Louisiana border, regardless of the time of day. Stronger dry line passages result in a sharp drop in dew point, clearing skies, and a wind shift from south or south-easterly to west or south-westerly. Blowing dust and rising temperatures also may follow, especially if the dry line passes during the daytime. These changes occur in reverse order when the dry line retreats westward during the evening and nighttime hours. Severe and sometimes tornadic thunderstorms often develop along the slope-reversal zone east of the surface dry line, especially when it begins moving eastward.

== Associated weather ==
In the dry sector west of the dry line, clear skies are the rule due to the dryness of the air mass sweeping in from the Desert Southwest in North America, and the Aravalli Range in India. If winds are strong enough, dust storms can develop. Cumulus clouds are common east of the dry line in the moist sector, though they are taller with greater development along the dry line itself. The moist sector is normally capped with a lid of an elevated mixed drier layer which represents subsidence from aloft as the surface air cools and contracts at night. The same process promotes the development of a low level jet to the east of the dryline. During the daytime, if heating and/or convergence are sufficient, the cap can be broken, resulting in convective clouds.

== See also ==
- Dew point depression
- Surface weather analysis
- Weather front
- Outflow boundary
