= Tilted updraft =

Type of thunderstorm

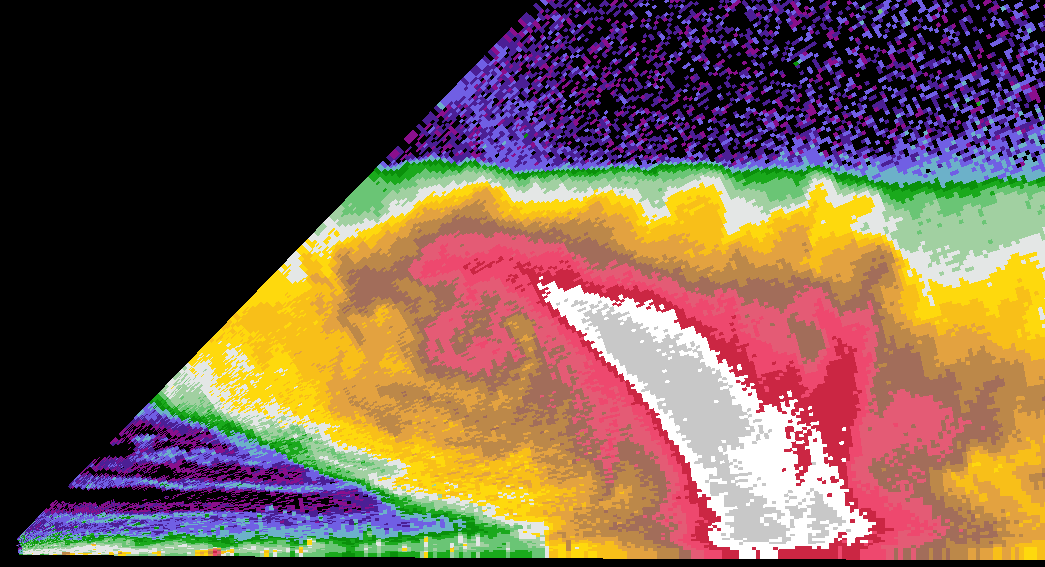
RHI from a research radar in Colorado sampling a visibly tilted updraft

A tilted updraft (also known as a tilted storm) is a thunderstorm which is not vertically erect. This happens as a result of unidirectional wind shear, or a change in wind speed with height. In such an environment, the top of the updraft is pushed further downstream than the lower parts as a result of stronger winds pushing the top, as it is higher in the atmosphere. Storms that occur in environments with wind shear are more likely to be severe.
