= Microscale meteorology =

Short-lived weather over a small area

Microscale meteorology or micrometeorology is the study of short-lived atmospheric phenomena smaller than mesoscale, about 1 kilometre (0.6 mi) or less. These two branches of meteorology are sometimes grouped together as "mesoscale and microscale meteorology" (MMM) and together study all phenomena smaller than synoptic scale; that is they study features generally too small to be depicted on a standard weather map. These include small and generally fleeting cloud "puffs" and other small cloud features. Microscale meteorology controls the most important mixing and dilution processes in the atmosphere. Important topics in microscale meteorology include heat transfer and gas exchange between soil, vegetation, and/or surface water and the atmosphere caused by near-ground turbulence. Measuring these transport processes involves use of micrometeorological (or flux) towers. Variables often measured or derived include net radiation, sensible heat flux, latent heat flux, ground heat storage, and fluxes of trace gases important to the atmosphere, biosphere, and hydrosphere.

A micronet is an atmospheric and/or environmental observation network, composed of automated weather stations, used to monitor microscale phenomena. Micronets are sometimes considered a subtype of mesonet, and many micronets are a denser spatial resolution sub-network of a mesonet.

== See also ==
- Eddy covariance
- FLUXNET
- Microscale and macroscale models
- Misoscale meteorology
- Spatial scale
- Surface weather analysis
- Wind engineering
