= Dew point depression =

The dew point depression (T-Td) is the difference between the temperature and dew point temperature at a certain height in the atmosphere. A lower dew point depression indicates that the air is more moist at a given temperature.

For a constant temperature, the smaller the difference, the more moisture there is, and the higher the relative humidity. In the lower troposphere, more moisture (small dew point depression) results in lower cloud bases and lifted condensation levels (LCL). LCL height is an important factor modulating severe thunderstorms. One example concerns tornadogenesis, with tornadoes most likely if the dew point depression is 20 °F (11 °C) or less, and the likelihood of large, intense tornadoes increasing as dew point depression decreases. LCL height also factors in downburst and microburst activity. Conversely, instability is increased when there is a mid-level dry layer (large dew point depression) known as a "dry punch", which is favorable for convection if the lower layer is buoyant.

As it measures moisture content in the atmosphere, the dew point depression is also an important indicator in agricultural and forest meteorology, particularly in predicting wildfires.

== See also ==
- Wet-bulb depression
- Atmospheric thermodynamics
