= Misoscale meteorology =

Unofficial scale of meteorology phenomena

Misoscale is an unofficial scale of meteorological phenomena that ranges in size from 40 metres (100 ft) to about 4 kilometres (2 mi). This scale was proposed by Ted Fujita, the founder of the Fujita scale, to classify phenomenon of the order of the rotation within a thunderstorm, the scale of the funnel cloud or a tornado, and the size of the swath of destruction of a microburst. It is a subdivision of the microscale.

== See also ==
- Synoptic scale
- Mesoscale
