= Tornadogenesis =

Process by which a tornado forms

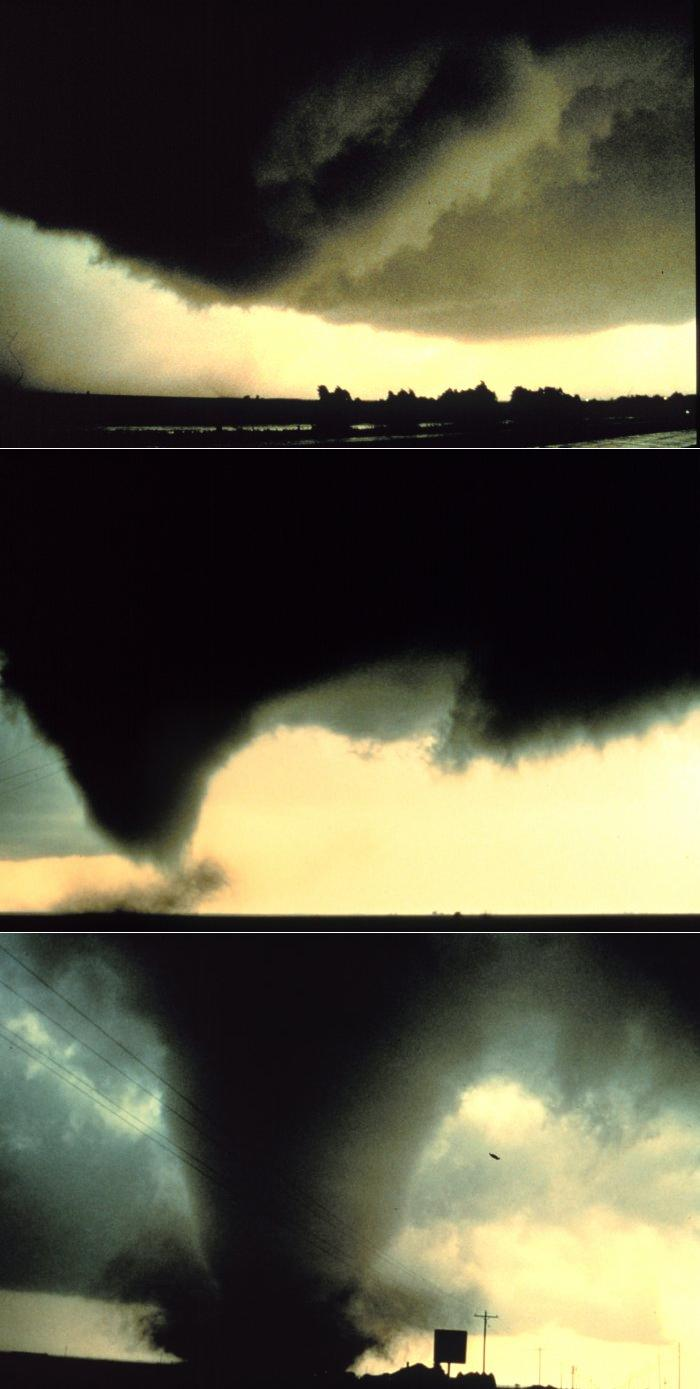
A sequence of images showing the birth of a supercellular tornado. First, the rain-free cloud base lowers as a rotating wall cloud. This lowering concentrates into a funnel cloud, which continues descending simultaneously as a circulation builds near the surface, kicking up dust and other debris. Finally, the visible funnel extends to the ground, and the tornado begins causing major damage.

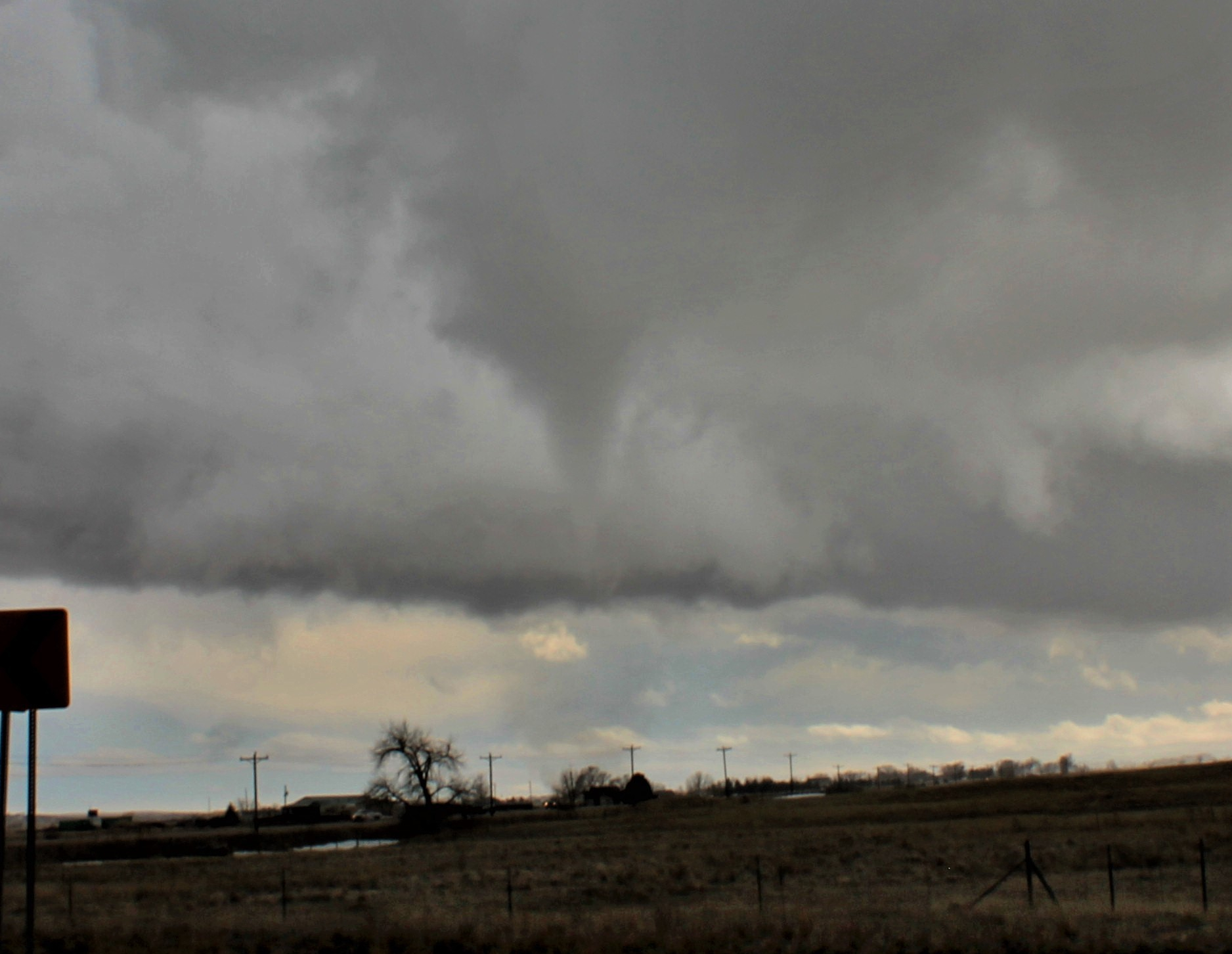
Tornadogenesis occurring in Falcon, Colorado. Note the faint dust swirl beneath the funnel cloud.

A diagram showing the contributing weather systems to Tornado Alley in the United States, a loosely-defined area that is prone to tornadoes.

Tornadogenesis is the process by which a tornado forms. There are many types of tornadoes, varying in methods of formation. Despite ongoing scientific study and high-profile research projects such as VORTEX, tornadogenesis remains a complex process, and the intricacies of many tornado formation mechanisms are still poorly understood.

A tornado is a violently rotating column of air in contact with the surface and a cumuliform cloud base. Some tornadoes can be more violent than others, with the widest tornado recorded in history being 2.6 miles wide. Tornado formation is caused by the stretching and aggregating/merging of environmental and/or storm-induced vorticity that tightens into an intense vortex. There are various ways this may come about and thus various forms and sub-forms of tornadoes. Although each tornado is unique, most kinds of tornadoes go through a life cycle of formation, maturation, and dissipation. The process by which a tornado dissipates or decays, occasionally conjured as tornadolysis, is of particular interest for study as is tornadogenesis, longevity, and intensity.

== Mesocyclones ==
Classical tornadoes are supercellular tornadoes, which have a recognizable pattern of formation. The cycle begins when a strong thunderstorm develops a rotating mesocyclone a few miles up in the atmosphere. As rainfall in the storm increases, it drags with it an area of quickly descending air known as the rear flank downdraft (RFD). This downdraft accelerates as it approaches the ground, and drags the rotating mesocyclone towards the ground with it. Storm relative helicity (SRH) has been shown to play a role in tornado development and strength. SRH is horizontal vorticity that is parallel to the inflow of the storm and is tilted upwards when it is taken up by the updraft, thus creating vertical vorticity.

As the mesocyclone lowers below the cloud base, it begins to take in cool, moist air from the downdraft region of the storm. The convergence of this cool air and the warm air in the updraft causes a rotating wall cloud to form. The RFD also focuses the mesocyclones' base, causing it to siphon air from a smaller and smaller area on the ground. As the updraft intensifies, it creates an area of low pressure at the surface. This pulls the focused mesocyclone down, in the form of a visible condensation funnel. As the funnel descends, the RFD also reaches the ground, creating a gust front that can cause severe damage a good distance from the tornado. Usually, the funnel cloud begins causing damage on the ground (becoming a tornado) within a few minutes of the RFD reaching the ground.

Field studies have shown that in order for a supercell to produce a tornado, the RFD needs to be no more than a few kelvin cooler than the updraft. The forward flank downdraft (FFD) also seems to be warmer within tornadic supercells than in non-tornadic supercells.

Many envision a top-down process in which a mid-level mesocyclone first forms and couples with a low-level mesocyclone or tornadocyclone, with a vortex then forming below the cloud base and becoming a concentrated vortex due to convergence upon reaching the surface. However, observation history and more modern research indicates that many tornadoes form first near the surface or simultaneously from the surface to low and mid levels aloft.

See the dynamics, thermodynamics and energy source.

== Misocyclones ==
=== Waterspouts ===

Waterspouts are defined as tornadoes over water. However, while some waterspouts are supercellular (also known as "tornadic waterspouts"), forming in a process similar to that of their land-based counterparts, most are much weaker and caused by different processes of atmospheric dynamics. They normally develop in moisture-laden environments with little vertical wind shear in areas where wind comes together (convergence), such as land breezes, lake effect bands, lines of frictional convergence from nearby landmasses, or surface troughs. Waterspouts normally develop as their parent clouds are in the process of development. It is theorized that they spin upward as they move up the surface boundary from the horizontal shear near the surface, and then stretch upward to the cloud once the low level shear vortex aligns with a developing cumulus or thunderstorm. Their parent cloud can be as innocuous as a moderate cumulus, or as significant as a supercell.

=== Landspouts ===
Landspouts are tornadoes that do not form from mesocyclones. They are similar in appearance and structure to fair-weather waterspouts, except that they form over land instead of water. They are thought to form similarly to weaker waterspouts in that they form during the growth stage of convective clouds by the ingestion and tightening of boundary layer vorticity by the cumuliform tower's updraft.

== Mesovortices ==
=== QLCS ===
Tornadogenesis in a rope tornado

Tornadoes sometimes form from mesovortices within squall lines (QLCS, quasi-linear convective systems), most often in middle latitudes regions. Mesocyclonic tornadoes may also form from embedded supercells within squall lines.

=== Tropical cyclones ===
Mesovortices or mini-swirls within intense tropical cyclones, particularly within eyewalls, may lead to tornadoes. Embedded supercells may produce mesocyclonic tornadoes in the right front quadrant of the cyclone, or in certain situations within its outer rainbands.

== Fire whirls and pyro-tornadogenesis ==
Most fire or volcanic eruption–induced whirlwinds are not tornadic vortices. However, on rare occasion, circulations with large wildfires, conflagrations, or ejecta do reach an ambient cloud base. In extremely rare cases, pyrocumulonimbi with tornadic mesocyclones have been observed.

== See also ==
- Convective storm detection
- Cyclogenesis
