= Rear flank downdraft =

Type of region

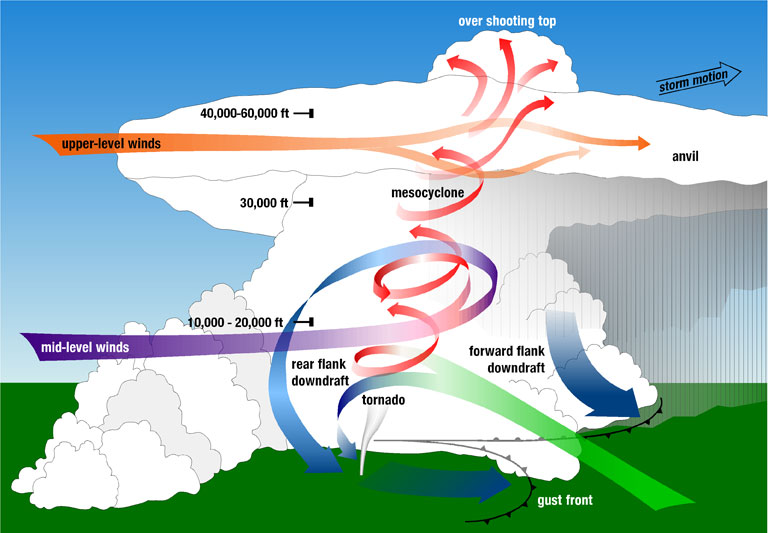
Air circulation in a supercell thunderstorm, including the rear flank downdraft

The rear flank downdraft (RFD) is a region of dry air wrapping around the back of a mesocyclone in a supercell thunderstorm. These areas of descending air are thought to be essential in the production of many supercellular tornadoes. Large hail within the rear flank downdraft often shows up brightly as a hook on weather radar images, producing the characteristic hook echo, which often indicates the presence of a tornado.

== Formation ==
The rear flank downdraft can arise owing to negative buoyancy, which can be generated by cold anomalies produced at the rear of the supercell thunderstorm by evaporative cooling of precipitation or hail melting, or injection of dry and cooler air in the cloud, and by vertical perturbation pressure gradients that can arise from vertical gradients of vertical vorticity, stagnation of environmental flow at an updraft, and pressure perturbations due to vertical buoyancy variations (which are partially due to hydrostatic effects).

Vertical pressure perturbations are generated by the buildup of pressure due to the vertical buoyancy, creating a pressure perturbation gradient. The subsiding air is generally dry and as it subsides the air warms adiabatically and can form a clearing in the cloud cover called a clear slot. A clear slot can be observed to wrap around a tornado or form away from a tornado in the shape of a horseshoe. This clearing is most likely the formation of the hook echo region associated with tornado formation. An RFD originating in dry air warming adiabatically can produce warmer observations out of the RFD at the surface.

=== Thermodynamic characteristics ===
RFDs may present themselves as a clear slot wrapping itself at least two-thirds of the way around the tornado, but the clear slot is not always evident in cases where an RFD is present. Many documents indicate that surface pressure excesses up to a few millibars exist within RFDs. Some findings showed that within the RFDs equivalent potential temperature (θe) is cold with respect to the inflow. Moreover, the lowest wet-bulb potential temperature (θw) values observed at the surface were within the RFD. There are, however, also observations of warm, high-θe air within RFDs.

=== Difference from forward flank downdraft ===
Compared to the forward flank downdraft (FFD) the rear flank downdraft (RFD) consists of warm and dry air. This is because the RFD is forced down from the mid-levels of the atmosphere, resulting in compressional heating of downward moving parcels. The FFD, in contrast, is driven by precipitation loading and evaporative cooling in the precipitation core of a supercell thunderstorm, making the FFD relatively cold and wet. Both are thought to be significant in tornado formation.

== Role in tornadogenesis ==
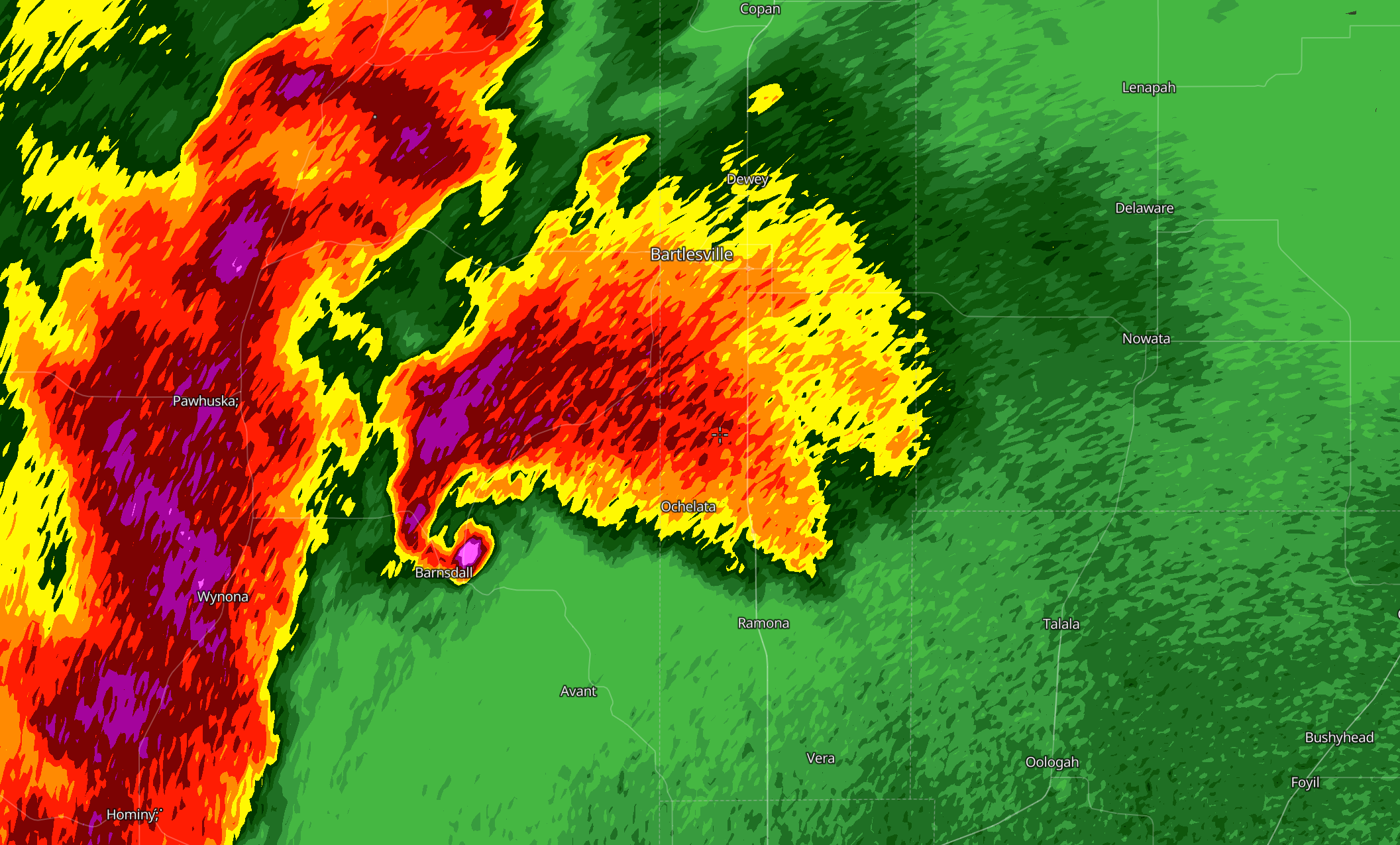
A textbook hook echo, indicating the presence of a rear flank downdraft (and in this case, a tornado). The tornado associated with this echo was part of the May 2024 tornado outbreak sequence.

=== Association with hook echo ===
Rear-flank downdrafts have a well-established association with hook echoes. Firstly, the initial rear flank downdraft is air from aloft transported down to the surface by colliding and mixing with the storm. Secondly, hook echoes form through advection of precipitation from the rear of the main echo around the region of strong updraft. Thus, precipitation loading and evaporation cooling induced by the hook echo can enhance the downdraft. Some observations showed the presence of an enhanced downdraft in the vicinity of the strongest low-level rotation, behind the main storm updraft.

Dry environmental air is also entrained into the downdraft and evaporative cooling helps create more negatively buoyant air. As precipitation falls and cool entrained air circulated downward and eventually reaching the surface. This contributes to the circulation to form a hook echo. It was concluded the presence of a hook echo can reflect downdraft intensification.

=== Association with tornadoes ===
Many researchers have realized that rear flank downdrafts, especially those associated with hook echoes, are fundamentally critical to tornado formation (tornadogenesis). In 1975, Ted Fujita originated the recycling hypothesis of tornadogenesis: First, downdraft air is recirculated into the (developing) tornado, which results in an appreciable convergence on the back side of the (still developing) tornado. Then the downward transport of the angular momentum by precipitation, and the recycling of air into the tornado, will create a tangential acceleration required for the intensification of the tornado as a positive feedback loop.

Observations of low-level vorticity couplets within RFDs indicate that tilting of vorticity by the RFD is important in the formation of tornadoes within supercell storms. During the tornadogenesis phase in supercells, the parcels of air infiltrating the tornado or incipient tornado regularly seem to pass through the hook echo and RFD, which can serve as the basis for Fujita's recycling hypothesis. Furthermore, observations of the clear slot during and just prior to the tornadic stage, imply the air infiltrating the tornado may come from the RFD.

Regularly, generation of large vertical vorticity close to the surface in an environment which is required for tornadogenesis, is attributed to downdraft. Tornadoes may arise, however, in the absence of a downdraft in environments containing preexisting vertical vorticity at the surface, such as in some cases of nonsupercell tornadogenesis.

Downdraft may have the following roles in near-ground mesocyclogenesis:

1. tilts horizontal vorticity to produce vertical vorticity
2. transports air containing vertical vorticity from mid-level to the surface
3. enhances the near-ground vorticity convergence beneath the updraft tremendously by entering the updraft and stretching vertically

== See also ==
- Hook echo
- Supercell
- Thunderstorm
- Tornado
- Vertical draft

== Bibliography ==
- Wallace; Hobbs (2006). Atmospheric Science: An Introductory Survey. Elsevier Academic Press. pp. 350–351. ISBN 9780127329512.
- Bluestein (1993). Synoptic-Dynamic Meteorology in Midlatitudes II. pp. 491, 493–495, 501.
