= Mesocyclone =

Region of rotation within a powerful thunderstorm

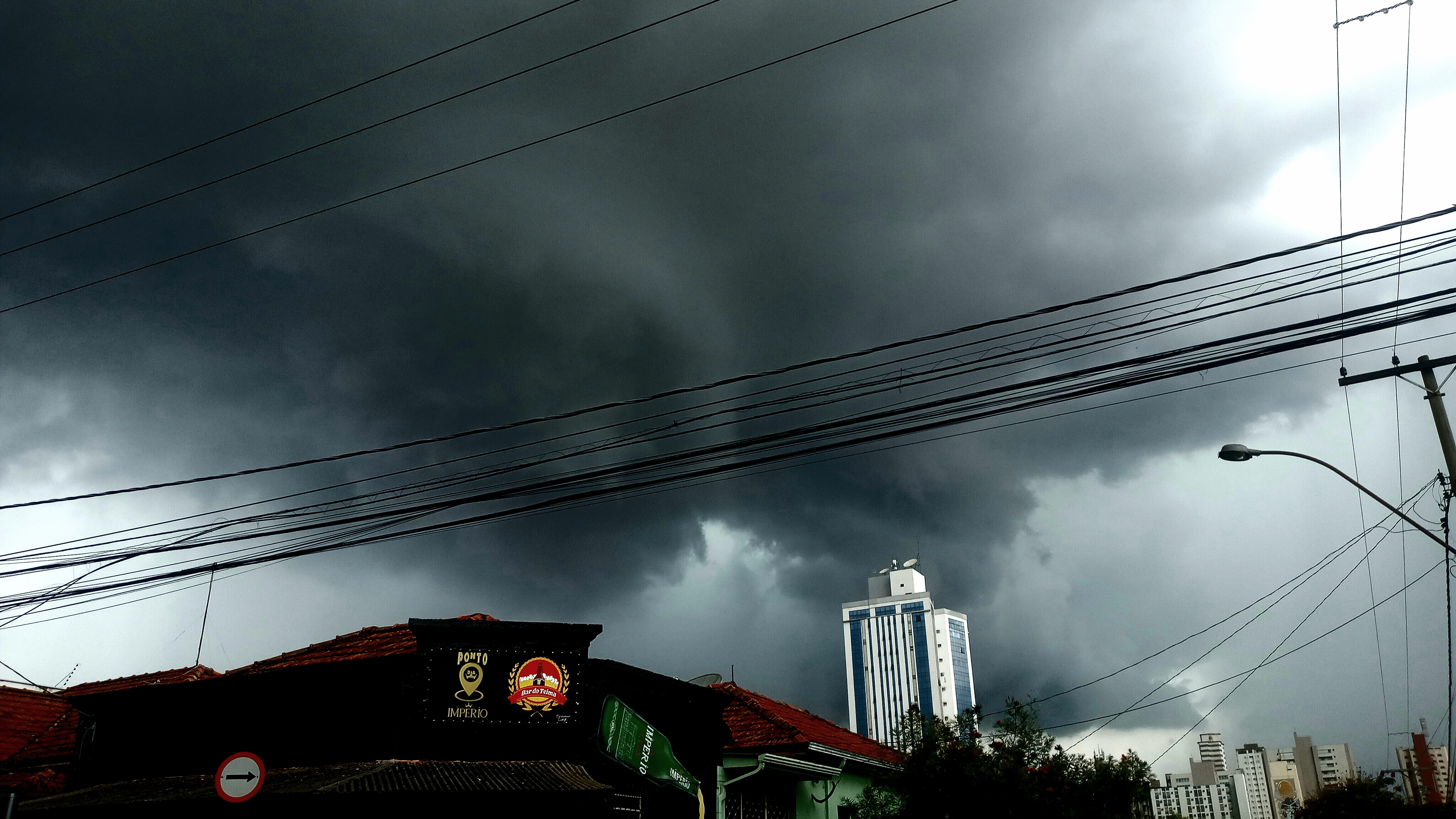
A mesocyclone (at left) in the Central Zone of the city of Piracicaba, in southeastern Brazil, on January 28, 2025

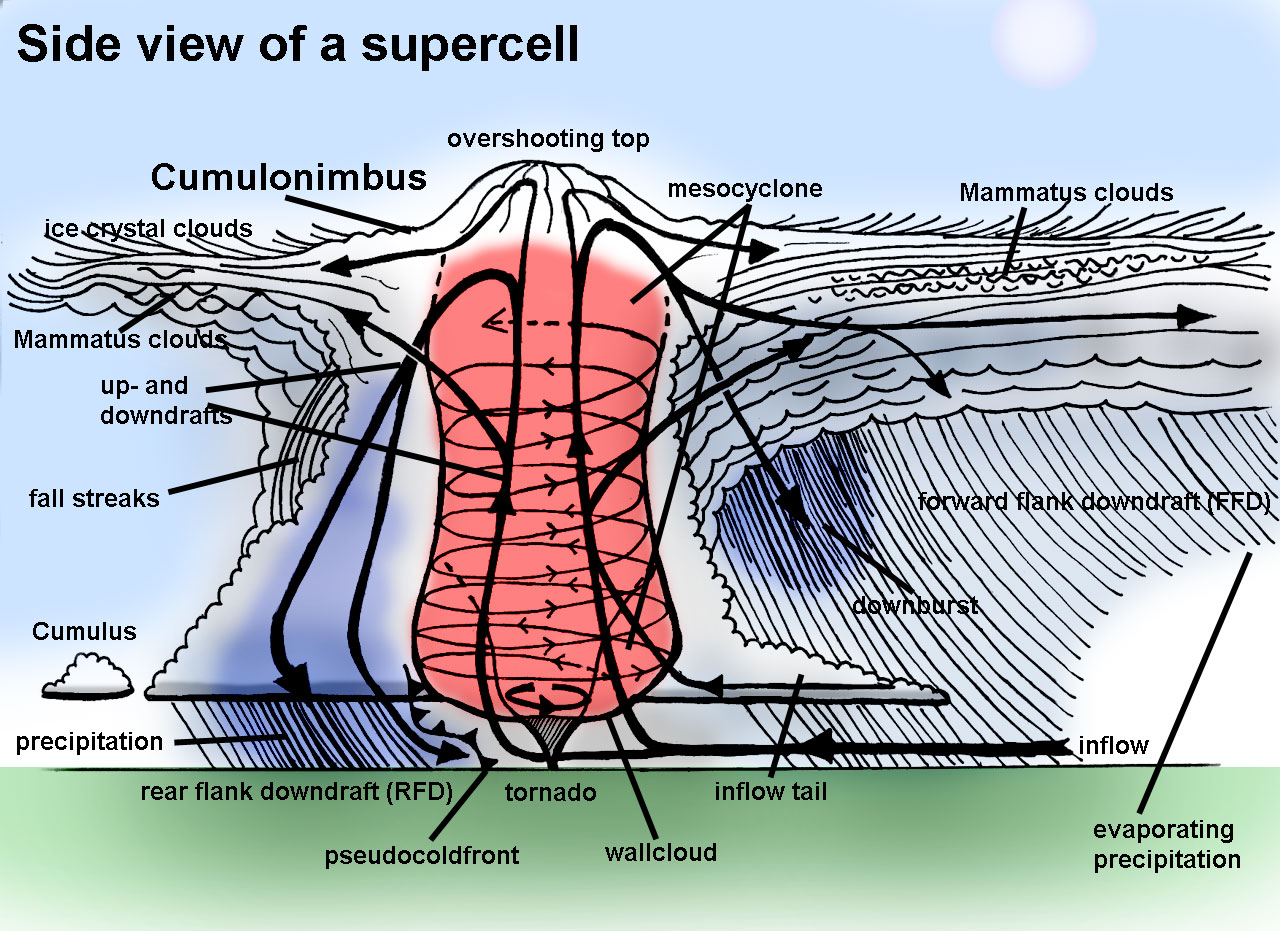
Supercell diagram with the mesocyclone rotation in red

A mesocyclone is a meso-gamma mesoscale (or storm scale) region of rotation (vortex), typically around 2 to 6 mi (3.2 to 9.7 km) in diameter, most often noticed on radar within thunderstorms. In the Northern Hemisphere, it is usually located in the right rear flank (back edge with respect to direction of movement) of a supercell, or often on the eastern, or leading, flank of a high-precipitation variety of supercell. The area overlaid by a mesocyclone’s circulation may be several miles (km) wide, but substantially larger than any tornado that may develop within it, and it is within mesocyclones that intense tornadoes form.

== Description ==
Mesocyclones are medium-scale vortices of rising and converging air that circulate around a vertical axis. They are most often associated with a local region of low-pressure. Their rotation is (usually) in the same direction as low pressure systems in a given hemisphere: counter-clockwise in the northern, and clockwise in the southern hemisphere, with the only occasional exceptions being the smallest-scale mesocyclones. Mesoanticyclones that rotate in an opposite direction may accompany mesocyclones within a supercell but these tend to be weaker and often more transient than mesocyclones, which can be sustained for tens of minutes or hours, and also cyclically form in succession within a supercell. Mesoanticyclones are relatively common with left-moving supercells that split from parent supercells in certain vertical wind shear regimes.

A mesocyclone is usually a phenomenon that is difficult to observe directly. Visual evidence of rotation – such as curved inflow bands – may suggest the presence of a mesocyclone, but the cylinder of circulating air is often too large to be recognized when viewed from the ground, or may not carry clouds distinct enough from the surrounding calmer air to make the circulating air flow obvious.

Mesocyclones are identified by Doppler weather radar observations as a rotation signature which meets specific criteria for magnitude, vertical depth, and duration. On U.S. NEXRAD radar displays, algorithmically identified mesocyclones, such as by the mesocyclone detection algorithm (MDA), are typically highlighted by a yellow solid circle on the Doppler velocity display; other weather services may have other conventions.

== Within thunderstorms ==
They are of greatest concern when contained within severe thunderstorms, since mesocyclones often occur together with updrafts in supercells, within which tornadoes may form near the interchange with a downdraft.

Mesocyclones are localized, approximately 2 km (1.2 mi) to 10 km (6.2 mi) in diameter within strong thunderstorms. Thunderstorms containing persistent mesocyclones are supercell thunderstorms (although some supercells and even tornadic storms do not produce lightning or thunder and thus are not technically thunderstorms). Doppler weather radar is used to identify mesocyclones. A mesovortex is a similar but typically smaller and weaker rotational feature associated with squall lines.

== Formation ==
One of the main ingredients for mesocyclogenesis is the presence of strong changes in wind speed over distance and direction with height, also known as horizontal and vertical wind shear. This shear classically coincides with the presence of a strong trough which may lead to an extratropical cyclone, a type of cyclone that forms through the interactions between cold and warm air, known as baroclinicity. The pressure and temperature gradients between warm and cold air cause these changes in the wind with height and over distance. The resulting sheared wind field is said to have horizontal vorticity, or the local tendency of the flowing fluid (here, air) to rotate, which is a property inherent to any flow where velocity gradients exist.

The associated vorticity is often incorrectly depicted as a horizontally-rolling vortex that is directly tilted into the vertical by a rising updraft. However, in the majority of cases, the environment is horizontally homogenous with said vortexes being absent. Horizontal vorticity can instead be thought as an imaginary paddle wheel that is set spinning by the winds that change with height. These winds move the top and bottom of the wheel at different speeds along the horizontal direction, causing it to twist along its axis. This local tendency for rotation, or twisting, is what the updraft reorients, rather than a literal tube or vortex of rotating air. When an updraft forms in this environment, ascending air parcels encounter faster sheared air across height, exchanging horizontal momentum via pressure perturbations at the updraft's boundary.The rising air at the edge of the updraft speeds up sideways faster than it is moving inward, forcing inner slower air to then also move faster horizontally. Air parcels then begin to curve as they move towards and overshoot the updraft's center of low pressure, following into a spiral as the process repeats. As the air parcels curve they also rotate about their axis due to the wind shear's twisting motion. This curving, spiraling or rotating motion of the wind can exist without the air necessarily spinning as a vortex.

At this point, the updraft is then said to have differentially advected the momentum of the sheared flow; that is, the differences between the flowing air over a horizontal direction is translated to a vertical direction, resulting in curvature vorticity or the apparent curving and spiraling seen in the rising air (only when horizontal vorticity is streamwise, or parallel to the updraft's inflow). However only a segment of a vortex arises; the streamlines are not closed, and there are asymmetries as not all air parcels are rising equally or spiraling at the same rate and direction, so true uniform rotation does not yet exist. In order for organized rotation (an enclosed vortex) to exist, the resulting curvature vorticity must be partially converted to vertical shear vorticity.

The updraft's pressure field primarily aids in this process, working to reorganize the curvature vorticity so that as the rising and spiraling air moves towards the center of low pressure, adjacent air parcels flowing across the updraft's pressure gradient begin rotating at different rates relative to each other. This creates vertical shear vorticity that enhances further rising air motion. The older air now more easily escapes the updraft and the low pressure center strengthens, then contracts in response, tightening the pressure gradient and causing converging air to rise even higher and faster. The effect is that the updraft is "stretched" upward as it more efficiently sucks up air, with rotation then becoming more organized due to conservation of angular momentum. Since the updraft now pulls in air more strongly, it pulls in more mass and momentum from the surrounding environment, which is conserved in the updraft. In nature this process happens simultaneously with the advection of the wind shear's momentum.

As air parcels continue to converge towards the center of low pressure, parcels closer to the center rotate faster and so are tugged outward due to centrifugal forces, while outer slower moving parcels move inward. The inner faster rotating air exerts a pressure force against the slower moving air, and causes the slower air to speed up. This continues until most air parcels have reached a uniform rate of rotation. Curvature vorticity and vertical shear vorticity are now in balance, and the result is a single coherent vortex that emerges in the updraft. A mesocyclone has formed (spinning counterclockwise in the Northern Hemisphere, and clockwise in the Southern Hemisphere) and the incipient supercell storm fully matures.

As the low-level mesocyclone continues to ingest horizontal vorticity, vorticity maximums or vortex patches (areas of slight rotation or transient vortices) may form alongside the boundary where the updraft and its downdrafts – the cool and moist forward flank downdraft (FFD) and the, often, warmer and more buoyant rear flank downdraft (RFD) – meet due to the interactions between the warmer and cooler air masses. Surges in the RFD often coincide with the consolidation of these vortex patches, and may lead to tornadogenesis as a result. This is visually indicated by the formation of a wall cloud or other low cloud structures near the surface as the updraft strengthens from its interactions with the RFD.

The gallery below shows the three stages of development of a mesocyclone and a view of the storm relative motion on radar of a mesocyclone-producing tornado over Greensburg, Kansas on 4 May 2007. The storm was in the process of producing an EF5 tornado at the time of the image.

Wind shear (red) sets air spinning (green).

The updraft (blue) 'tips' the spinning air upright.

The updraft then starts rotating.

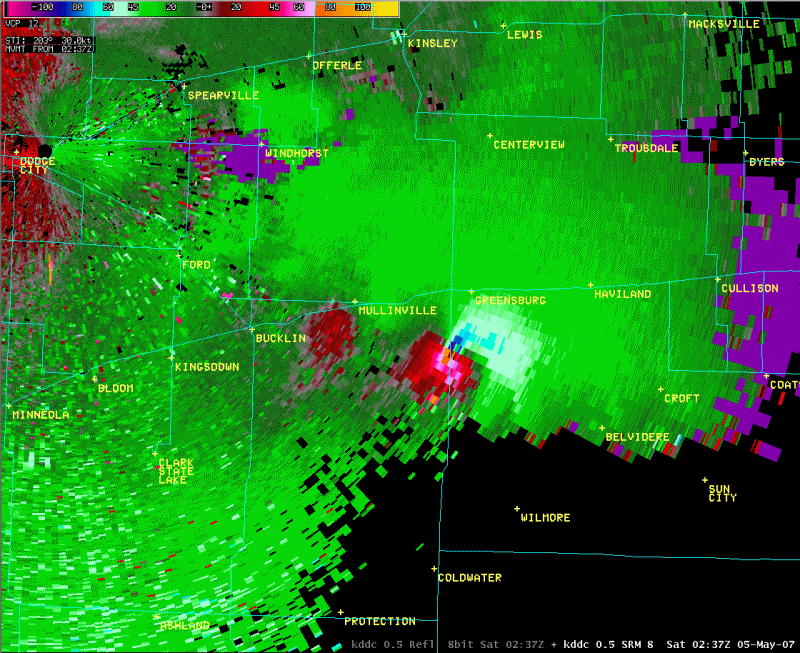
Radar view of a mesocyclone. Note that at the time of this image, an EF5 tornado was on the ground.

== Identification ==
The most reliable way to detect a mesocyclone is by Doppler weather radar. Nearby high values of opposite sign within velocity data are how they are detected. Mesocyclones are most often located in the right-rear flank of supercell thunderstorms and when embedded within squall lines (whereas mesovortices most often form in the front flank of squall lines), and may be distinguished by a hook echo rotation signature on a weather radar map. Visual cues such as a rotating wall cloud or tornado may also hint at the presence of a mesocyclone. This is why the term has entered into wider usage in connection with rotating features in severe storms.

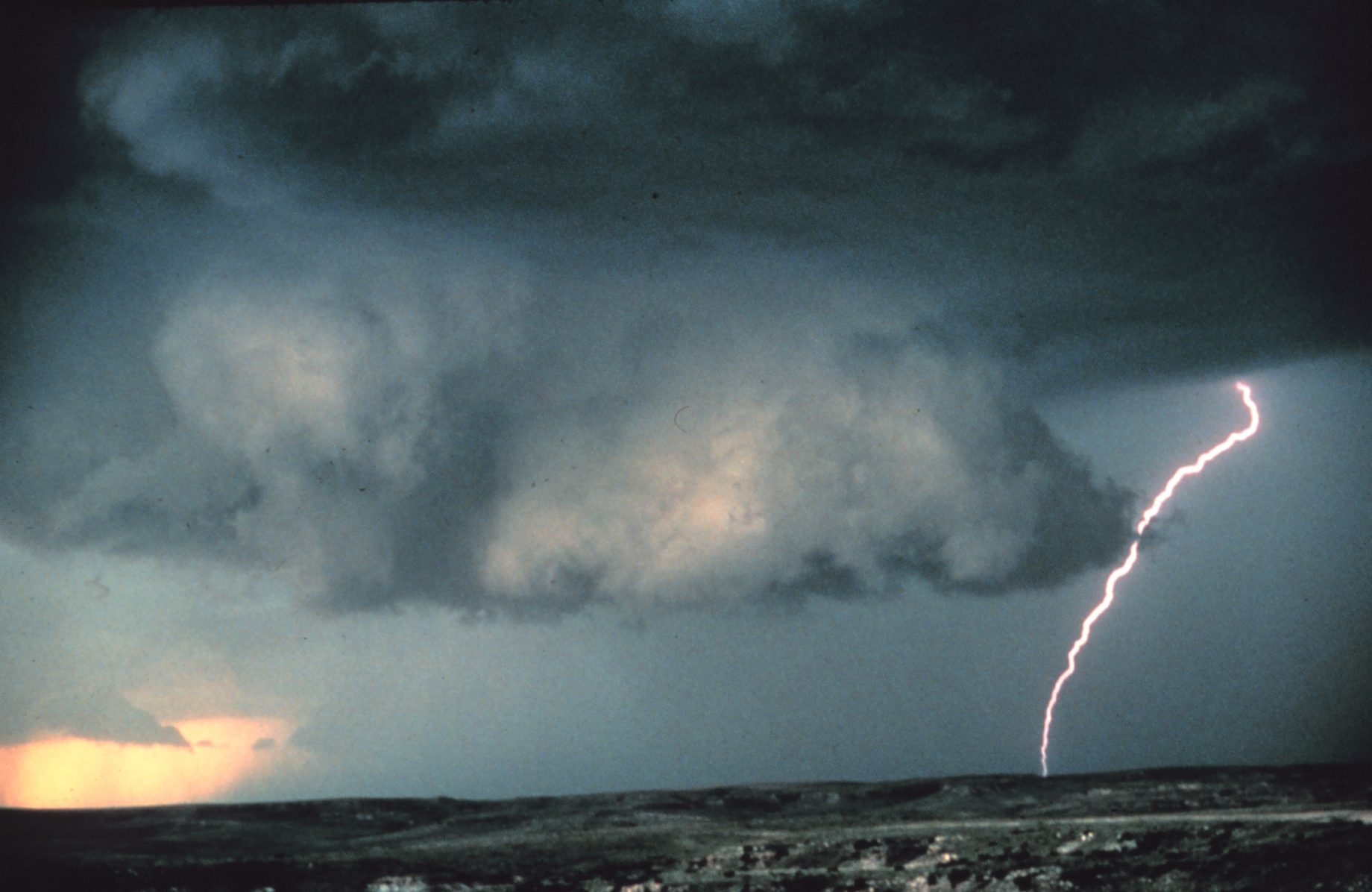
Mesocyclones are sometimes visually identifiable by a rotating wall cloud like the one in this thunderstorm over Texas.

Mesocyclone detection algorithm output on tornadic cells in Northern Michigan on July 3, 1999

== Tornado formation ==
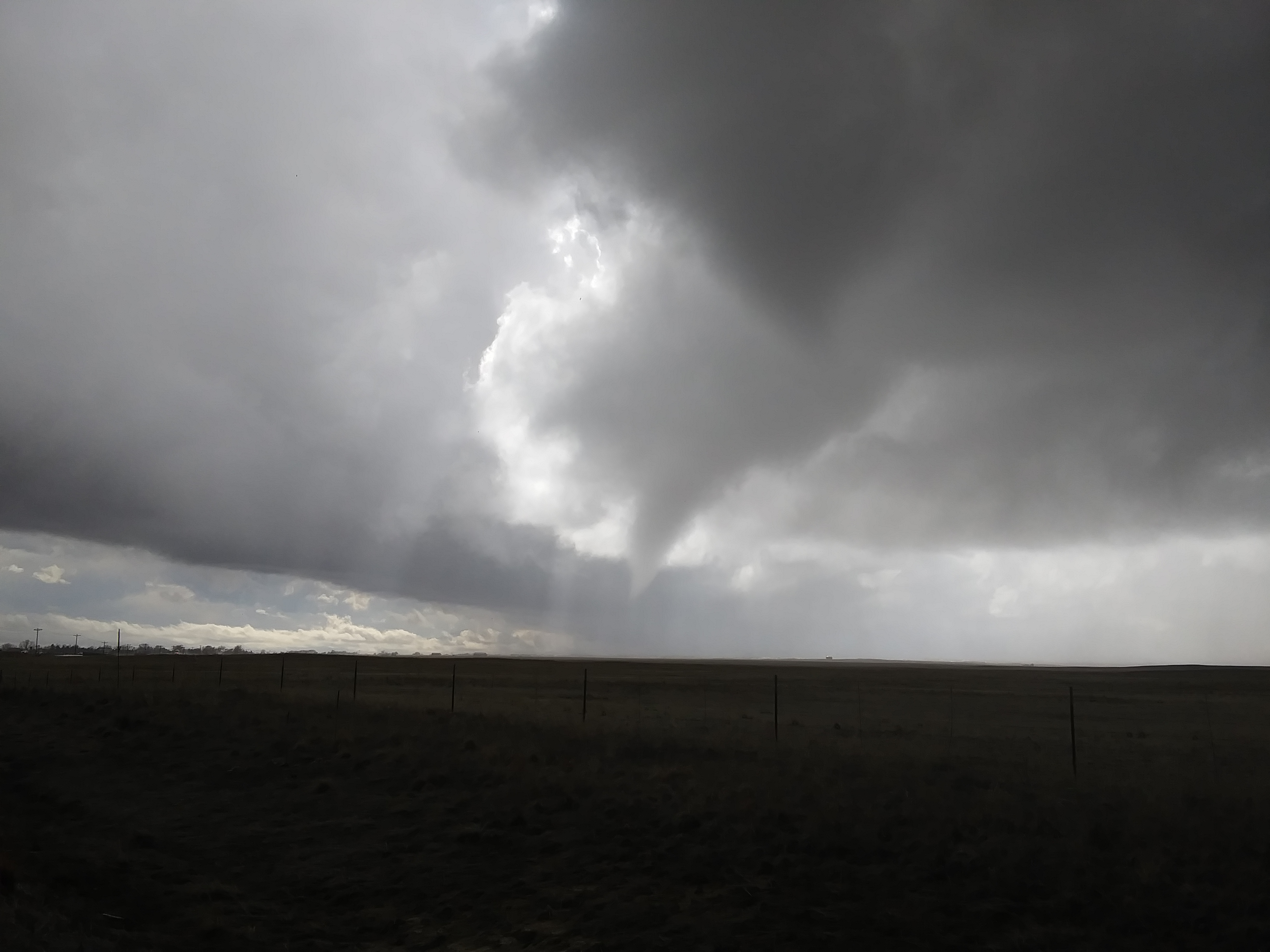
A tornado developing under a wall cloud within a mesocyclone near Falcon, Colorado

Tornado formation is not completely understood, but often occurs in one of two ways.

In the first way, two conditions must be satisfied. First, a horizontal spinning effect must form on the Earth's surface. This usually originates in sudden changes in wind direction or speed, known as wind shear. Second, a cumulonimbus cloud, or occasionally a cumulus cloud, must be present.

During a thunderstorm, updrafts are occasionally powerful enough to lift the horizontal spinning row of air upwards, turning it into a vertical air column. This vertical air column then becomes the basic structure for the tornado. Tornadoes that form in this way are often weak and generally last less than 10 minutes.

The second way occurs during a supercell thunderstorm, in updrafts within the storm. When winds intensify, the force released can cause the updrafts to rotate. This rotating updraft is known as a mesocyclone.

For a tornado to form in this manner, a rear-flank downdraft enters the center of the mesocyclone from the back. Cold air, being denser than warm air, is able to penetrate the updraft. The combination of the updraft and downdraft completes the development of a tornado. Tornadoes that form in this method are often violent and can last over an hour.

== Mesoscale convective vortex ==
A mesoscale convective vortex (MCV), also known as a mesoscale vorticity center or Neddy eddy, is a mesocyclone within a mesoscale convective system (MCS) that pulls winds into a circling pattern, or vortex, at the mid levels of the troposphere and is normally associated with anticyclonic outflow aloft, with a region of aeronautically troublesome wind shear between the upper and lower air. With a core only 30 to 60 miles (48 to 97 km) wide and 1 to 3 miles (1.6 to 4.8 km) deep, an MCV is often overlooked in standard weather maps. MCVs can persist for up to two days after its parent mesoscale convective system has dissipated.

The orphaned MCV can become the seed of the next thunderstorm outbreak. An MCV that moves into tropical waters, such as the Gulf of Mexico, can serve as the nucleus for a tropical cyclone. An example of this was Hurricane Barry in 2019. MCVs can produce very large wind storms; sometimes winds can reach over 100 miles per hour (160 km/h). The May 2009 Southern Midwest Derecho was an extreme progressive derecho and mesoscale convective vortex event that struck southeastern Kansas, southern Missouri, and southwestern Illinois on 8 May 2009.
