= Vertical draft =

Small-scale current of rising air

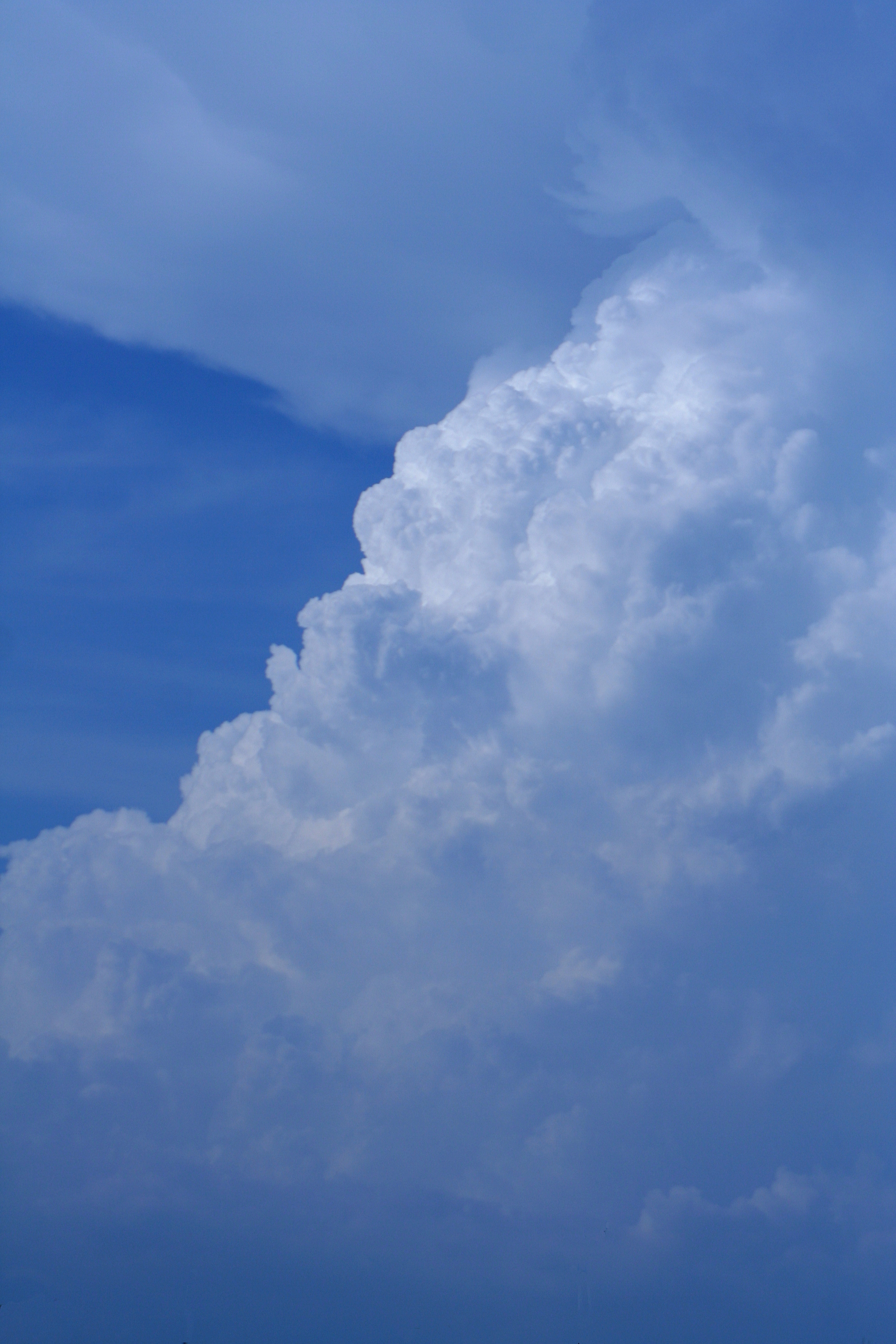
Warm, moist updraft from a thunderstorm associated with a southward-moving frontal boundary - taken from Texarkana, Texas, looking north

In meteorology, vertical draft are small-scale currents of rising or falling air, often within a cloud. They can either be updraft (British English: up-draught) or downdraft (British English: down-draught)

== Overview ==
Vertical drafts, known as updrafts or downdrafts, are localized regions of warm or cool air that move vertically. A mass of warm air will typically be less dense than the surrounding region, and so will rise until it reaches air that is either warmer or less dense than itself. The converse will occur for a mass of cool air, and is known as subsidence. This movement of large volumes of air, especially when regions of hot, wet air rise, can create large clouds, and is the central source of thunderstorms. Drafts can also be caused by low or high pressure regions. A low pressure region will attract air from the surrounding area, which will move towards the center and then rise, creating an updraft. A high pressure region will attract air to the surrounding area, which will sink towards the center and push outwards, spawning a downdraft.

Updrafts and downdrafts, along with wind shear in general, are a major contributor to airplane crashes during takeoff and landing in a thunderstorm. Extreme cases, known as downbursts and microbursts, can be deadly and difficult to predict or observe. The crash of Delta Air Lines Flight 191 on its final approach before landing at Dallas/Fort Worth International Airport in 1985 was presumably caused by a microburst, and prompted the Federal Aviation Administration (FAA) to research and deploy new storm detection radar stations at some of the major airports, notably those in the South, Midwest, and Northeast United States where wind shear affects air safety. Downbursts can cause extensive localized damage, similar to that caused by tornadoes. Downburst damage can be differentiated from that of a tornado because the resulting destruction is circular and radiates away from the center. Tornado damage radiates inward, towards the center of the damage.

The term "downdraft" can also refer to a type of backdraft which occurs through chimneys which have fireplaces on the lowermost levels (such as basements) of multi-level buildings. It involves cold air coming down the chimney due to low air pressure, and makes it hard to light fires, and can push soot and carbon monoxide into domiciles.

== Updraft ==
An updraft (British English: up-draught) is a small-scale current of rising air

== Downdraft ==
A downdraft (British English: down-draught) is a small-scale current of falling air

== See also ==
- Terminal Doppler Weather Radar, a 5 cm Doppler weather radar design to detect wind shear near major airports in the U.S. (FAA) and abroad
- NEXRAD, a 10 cm radar in the U.S. that detects wind shear, but to a specific extent. (NOAA's National Weather Service)
- Low level windshear alert system
- Atmospheric thermodynamics
- Lee waves
- New Zealand National Airways Corporation Flight 441 — airplane crash linked to severe downdraft
- Rear flank downdraft and forward flank downdraft
- Thermal
