= 1995 Mayfest Storm =

1995 supercell storm in Texas

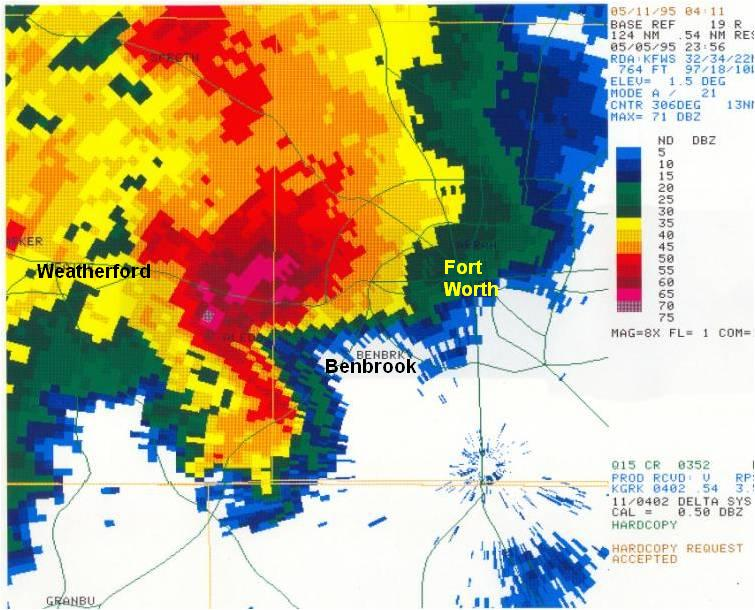
- NEXRAD radar image of the hailstorm at 6:56 p.m. CST, 14 minutes before striking the Fort Worth Mayfest

Meteorological history
- Formed: May 5, 1995

Hail storm
- Highest gusts: > 70 mph (115 km/h)

Overall effects
- Fatalities: 20
- Damage: $2 billion
- Areas affected: Dallas–Fort Worth metroplex (Dallas, Parker, and Tarrant counties)

The 1995 Mayfest storm was a damaging hailstorm that struck parts of the Dallas–Fort Worth metroplex on May 5, 1995. It was the first singular thunderstorm with a damage toll exceeding $1 billion and at the time the costliest nontornadic thunderstorm in U.S. history. Hail up to 4.5 in (11.5 cm) in diameter fell across Parker and Tarrant counties, producing hail drifts as deep as 3 ft (0.91 m) and damaging numerous buildings. The storm also struck the Fort Worth Mayfest – a local outdoor festival – pelting the roughly 10,000 people in attendance with softball-sized hail and resulting in over 60 hospitalizations. Though there were no hail-related fatalities, the combination of the slow-moving supercell that produced the hail and a larger complex of storms led to deadly flash flooding that killed 17 people in the Dallas area. Overall, 20 people were killed by the storms.

== Synopsis ==
A cold front had become stationary roughly 100 mi (160 km) south of the Dallas–Fort Worth metroplex by 7 p.m. CST on May 4, 1995. Weather models utilizing the concurrent weather conditions projected that the front would slowly recede northward over the course of May 5 in response to an approaching trough over the western U.S., while a nearby warm front would move north but remain well south of the metropolitan area. This depiction suggested that the associated thunderstorm potential for the region would peak after midnight on May 6. Accordingly, the National Severe Storms Forecast Center (NSSFC) and National Weather Service Fort Worth, Texas, both predicted that any severe weather on May 5 would be localized around the distant warm front to the south.

Despite the model projections and weather forecasts, the warm front moved north faster than anticipated on May 5. This unexpected frontal progression was prompted by the arrival of a strong portion of a jet stream over Northern Mexico and Southwestern Texas in tandem with another trough. The front was farther north than predicted on the afternoon of May 5 and ultimately stalled just south of the Dallas–Fort Worth metroplex as the associated warm air butted against cool air associated with a mesoscale convective system over Oklahoma. The warm air mass exhibited convective available potential energy values near 2000 J/kg, indicative of an unstable environment. In response, the local NWS office began issuing forecasts highlighting the potential high wind and large hail for the Dallas–Fort Worth metroplex.

In the early afternoon of May 5, a squall line developed along a dry line straddling the border between Texas and New Mexico. This cluster of thunderstorms moved east towards the Dallas–Fort Worth metroplex. The intersection of this squall line and the warm front led to the development of a mesolow that enhanced helicity nearby. Just after 5:30 p.m. CST, a high precipitation supercell formed roughly 40 mi (65 km) east of the squall line. The storm quickly developed near the border between Palo Pinto and Parker counties and acquired supercell characteristics as it tracked across Parker County. At 5:48 p.m. CST, the National Weather Service (NWS) issued a severe thunderstorm warning for Parker County. As the storm moved into southeastern Parker County, it exhibited a hook echo and a pronounced bounded weak echo region on weather radar imagery. Hail began to fall from the storm by around 6:17 p.m. CST. The mesocyclone associated with these radar features continued to produce a swath of large hail extending from southern Parker County into central Tarrant County, encompassing downtown Fort Worth. The hailfall struck the Fort Worth Mayfest – an outdoor festival along the banks of the Trinity River – at around 7:10 p.m. CST. The NWS issued a tornado warning on the storm at 7:06 p.m. CST for Tarrant County, though no tornadoes were ultimately reported. A second mesocyclone developed as the storm moved over downtown Fort Worth, producing a second swath of large hail stretching from southern Fort Worth to Arlington. The storm slowed as it moved into Dallas County and ultimately merged with the approaching squall line to the west at around 7:30 p.m. CST. The combined complex of storms slowed as a result of the merger, leading to extensive flash flooding in northern and central Dallas through 9:40 p.m. CST; between 7:30 p.m. and 8:15 p.m., the forward speed of the storms decreased from 20 mph (30 km/h) to under 10 mph (15 km/h). Rainfall rates in northern Dallas neared 9 in (23 cm) per hour, with rain gauge observations recording rates nearly three times heavier than that estimated by weather radar. Rainfall amounts neared 2.25 in (57 mm) in 15 minutes.

== Impact ==
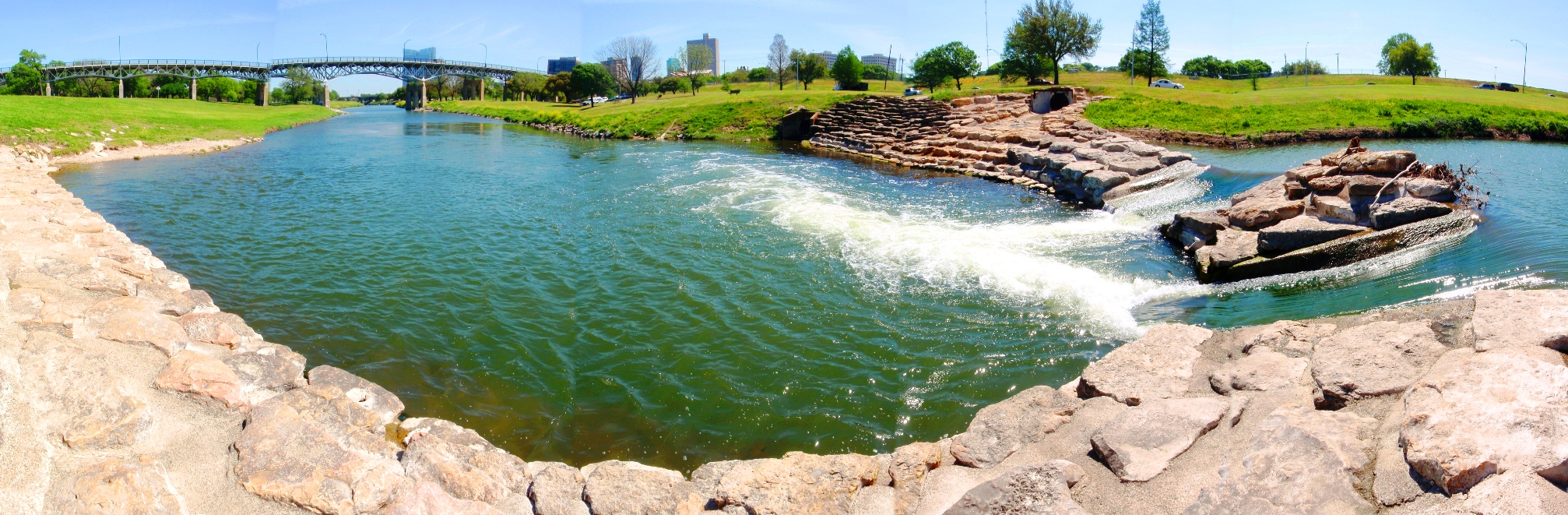
Trinity Park, the site of Mayfest, in 2010

The hailstorm was at the time the costliest non-tornadic severe thunderstorm in U.S. history. Total economic damage was near $2 billion, eclipsing the $500 million damage toll set by the previous costliest hailstorm. The Insurance Council of Texas assessed that insured losses inflicted by the storm amounted to $1.1 billion. Hail sizes associated with the storm ranged between 1.75–4.5 in (4.5–11.5 cm), and at one point the hail covered a region over 3 mi (5 km) wide. At one location in southern Parker County, the hail accumulated to a depth of 18 in (460 mm). The first region of hail produced by the storm – encompassing a swath 40 mi (64 km) long – included hail sizes ranging from 2.5–4.5 in (6.5–11.5 cm) and was accompanied by wind gusts topping 55 mph (90 km/h). The second hail swath – encompassing a swath 10 mi (16 km) long – was associated with hail sizes exceeding 2.25 in (6 cm) carried by winds nearing 90 mph (145 km/h). The large hail led to the hospitalizations of 60 people, with 4 critically injured. Winds were in excess of 65 mph (100 km/h). The subsequent flash flood killed 17 people. There were 20 fatalities overall.

The extreme rainfall that followed the hailstorm caused flooding in areas not considered flood-prone. The floods killed 16 people in Dallas County and 1 person in Tarrant County. Over 350 cars were damaged by the severe weather, including the hailstorm and the subsequent flood. The storms disrupted air and street traffic, as well as 9-1-1 service in some areas. One flight at Dallas Love Field diverted into a hangar ahead of the hailstorm. According to TU Electric, at least 84,000 homes were impacted by power outages.

Golf ball-sized hail occurred in the Annetta area, coating roads in a layer of ice and resulting in car accidents. In some locations, the aggregation of hail produced hail drifts measuring 3 ft (0.91 m) deep. Heavy rainfall led to flash flooding, inundating several roads. Two people were killed in Parker County by the flooding. The NWS estimated that the total cost of damage in Parker County reached $20 million.

Hail, water, or wind-related damage was inflicted on 257 businesses in Tarrant County. Wind gusts exceeding 70 mph (115 km/h) were also reported in the county. Baseball-sized hail fell in Benbrook. Around $4 million in damage occurred in Aledo, where at least 380 homes sustained hail damage. Over 10,000 people were attending the Fort Worth Mayfest when the storm hit, resulting in over 400 injuries, 60 hospitalizations, and 4 critical injuries. Hospitals ultimately treated injuries for 109 people. There was little shelter available to festival attendees to avoid being struck by softball-sized hail, with many of the injuries resulting from parents shielding their children. While most people sought shelter in their cars, car windows were shattered by the hail. Injuries to the attendees included bruises and broken arms and legs. Windows and skylights in downtown Fort Worth were destroyed by the hail, including the skylights on the Fort Worth City Hall. The wind-driven hail also destroyed some homes and buildings. Hail accumulated on some Fort Worth roads to a depth of 2 ft (0.6 m).

Although the total amount of rainfall produced by the storm was not extreme, with accumulations less than 5 in (125 cm), the combination of high rainfall rates and an urban setting led to unprecedented flooding. Peak rainfall rates measured by rain gauges in the Dallas area included 8.39 in/hr (231 mm/h) over a 5-minute interval, 8.27 in/hr (210 mm/h) over a 15-minute interval, and 4.53 in/hr (115 mm/h) over a 60-minute interval; these values were respectively 87%, 110%, and 115% the 100-year rainfall rates in Dallas for the associated time intervals. The highest rainfall totals occurred near Turtle Creek. Flooding in Dallas destroyed 4 single-family homes and 166 multifamily residential units; another 93 homes were damaged. Significant damage was inflicted upon 57 businesses and public schools incurred $375,000 in damage. A majority of the 16 flood deaths in Dallas were due to cars attempting to cross floodwaters. Within Dallas County, two people were killed by lightning. Heavy rainfall caused the collapse of the roof of a Haggar Clothing warehouse near Dallas Love Field, killing two people and injuring twelve. A hundred people were trapped by the fallen debris following the collapse. The downtown headquarters of the Dallas Police Department were flooded during the storm; at 10:20 p.m., the department was unable to answer 201 calls.

Following the Mayfest storm, the Tarrant County Radio Amateur Civil Emergency Service was moved on-site to outdoor events for weather information and emergency support.

== See also ==
- List of costly or deadly hailstorms
- 2000 Fort Worth tornado
- Tornado outbreak of October 20–22, 2019 – included the costliest tornado in Texas history
- Hurricane Betsy – the first tropical cyclone to cause more than US$1 billion in damage
