= List of costly or deadly hailstorms =

This is a list of the costliest or deadliest hailstorms on record.

== Notable events ==
=== North America ===
| Date | Location | Incident |
|---|---|---|
| 6 July 1928 | Potter, Nebraska, US | Measuring 7 in (178 mm) in diameter, and weighing 1.5 lb (680 g), this hailstone is believed to be the record largest known in the U.S. at the time. |
| 2 September 1960 | Southern California, US | Golf ball to baseball-sized hail occurred in parts of southern California, including 2.75 in (7.0 cm) (possibly larger) hail around Boulevard and in Riverside County. That is the largest hail recorded in southern California. A severe thunderstorm also struck San Bernardino. |
| 3 September 1970 | Coffeyville, Kansas, US | At the time the largest hailstone ever found in the U.S., measuring 5.7 in (140 mm) diameter, 17.5 in (440 mm) circumference, and 1.67 lb (760 g). |
| 30 July 1979 | Fort Collins, Colorado, US | A violent forty-minute hailstorm bombed Fort Collins, CO, with hail up to grapefruit size. Two thousand homes and 2500 automobiles were severely damaged, and about 25 people were injured, mainly when hit on the head by the huge stones. A three-month-old baby died of a fractured skull, struck by a large hailstone while being carried by her mother, who was running with her to seek cover. |
| 11 July 1990 | Denver, Colorado, US | Softball-sized hail destroyed roofs and cars, causing $625 million in total damage ($1.1 billion in damage adjusted to 2013 dollars). |
| 7 September 1991 | Calgary, Alberta, Canada | A thunderstorm caused $342 million worth of insurable damage in Calgary. Thirteen additional hailstorms between 1981 and 1998 caused an estimated $600 million in damage in the Calgary area alone. |
| 19 June 1992 | Wichita, Kansas, US | Two batches of severe thunderstorms, occurring within 6 hours of each other, dumped hailstones up to 4.5 in (11 cm) in diameter across Sedgwick, including the city of Wichita, and surrounding counties in south-central Kansas. Over 10,000 homes were damaged. The hail left wheat fields in a near total loss. Estimated property damage totaled $500 million with crop damage at $100 million. The thunderstorm episode ranks as one of the worst ever to hit Kansas. |
| 5 May 1995 | Dallas and Fort Worth, Texas, US | The 1995 Mayfest Storm produced $1.1 billion insured losses, and total storm damage was reported at around $2 billion. The storms produced hail about the size of softballs. |
| 24 July 1996 | Calgary, Alberta, and Winnipeg, Manitoba, Canada | Orange-sized hailstones caused almost $300 million worth of damage in Calgary and Winnipeg, as well as serious flooding. Notably, one-third of cars damaged by the storm were irreparable. |
| 29 March 2000 | Lake Worth, Texas, US | The last known hail fatality in the United States occurred. The victim was Juan Oseguera, a nineteen-year-old man who died from head injuries after being hit by a softball-sized hailstone in Lake Worth. |
| 18 May 2000 | Chicago area, Illinois, US | $572 million. Golfball-, baseball-, and softball-sized hail damaged roofs, cars, patio furniture, skylights, and windows in the area's worst and most widespread hailstorm in 30 years (McHenry, Lake, northern Kane, northern Cook County). Around 100,000 homes lost power. Hail was 3 in (76 mm) deep in many areas. There were 100 canceled flights, and train service was disrupted. |
| 10 April 2001 | St. Louis, Missouri, US | $2.0 billion+. The costliest hailstorm in US history struck the I-70 corridor of eastern Kansas, across Missouri, into southwestern Illinois producing many baseball-sized hail reports. |
| 22 June 2003 | Aurora, Nebraska, US | The largest hailstone on record at the time fell on this date. It had a 7-inch (178 mm) diameter and a circumference of 18.74 inches (476 mm). |
| 11 July 2004 | Edmonton, Alberta Canada | Grape-golf-ball sized hail and more than 150 millimetres (5.9 in) of rain in fell in 30 minutes, leaving 6 centimetres (2.4 in) deep of hail on the ground and flash flooding, it is estimated to be a 1-in-200 year event. Over 20,000 People were evacuated from West Edmonton Mall when the weight from the hail and rain caused the glass roofs to shatter. |
| 20–21 April 2006 | San Marcos, Texas, US | Hail of sizes up to 10 cm (3.9 in) resulted in 10,000 auto claims, 7,000 homeowner and commercial property claims ranging between $100–160 million insured losses. One woman was hospitalized. The storm was especially costly at the San Marcos Outlet Malls and a nearby Toyota dealership. |
| 20 July 2009 | Denver, Colorado, US | A hailstorm in the western suburbs of Denver caused $770 million (USD) damage. |
| 10 & 16 May 2010 | Oklahoma City, Oklahoma, US | Two major hailstorms separated by less than a week caused damage to large portions of the Oklahoma City metropolitan area. Damages from the first storm caused an estimated $595 million (USD) damage, and the second storm was expected to be around the same, totaling around $1 billion in damages. |
| 12 July 2010 | Calgary, Alberta, Canada | The hailstorm that pounded Calgary on 12 July eclipsed the record originally set in 1991, with insurable damages totaling at least $400 million, excluding agricultural crop damage. The storm brought hail as wide as 4 cm (1.6 in). |
| 23 July 2010 | Vivian, South Dakota, US | The largest diameter hailstone known, measuring 7.87 in (20.0 cm) in diameter and weighing 1.9375 lb (0.88 kg), fell on Vivian during an exceptional hailstorm. |
| 5 October 2010 | Phoenix, Arizona, US | The 5 Oct hailstones – some exceeding 2 inches in diameter – pounded cars, smashed windows and blasted apart roof tiles and shingles. The storm caused more than $2.7 billion in property damage, putting Arizona atop the 2010 list of states with the most insured-property losses. |
| 28 April 2012 | St. Louis, Missouri, US | A series of hailstorms amounted to the second costliest in U.S. history, at an estimated $1.6 billion in insured losses. |
| 13 June 2012 | Dallas and Fort Worth, Texas, US | Baseball- to softball-sized hail pummeled DFW causing significant damage to cars, houses, and other buildings. Estimated damages were approximately $900 million. |
| 12 August 2012 | Calgary, Alberta, Canada | A storm, with hailstones approximately the size of golf balls, battered Calgary for 10 minutes. A subsequent storm 2 days later brought in another round of hailstorm with high winds causing additional damage to the city. The cost of these events reached $552 million. |
| 12 April 2016 | San Antonio, Texas, US | A storm producing hail up to the size of grapefruits pummeled the city causing extensive damage to cars, homes, windows, and roofs. It is estimated that the storm cost 1.4 billion dollars in losses (the costliest in the state's history). |
| 8 May 2017 | Denver, Colorado, US | In what was then the most catastrophic storm in state history, baseball-sized stones pummeled the west Denver Metro area, resulting in extensive damage to homes, windows, vehicles (many of which were in the late day commute), and roofs. The storm surpassed the state's costliest wildfires, forced the closure of the Colorado Mills Mall until the end of 2017, and caused $2.3 billion in damage. |
| 9 June 2017 | Minneapolis, Minnesota, US | A storm system lasting over a week created severe hail and high wind damage, reaching from Minnesota to Texas to Virginia to New York. The Minneapolis metro area suffered especially, receiving hail damage to many buildings and vehicles. The total damage was estimated to be over $2.5 billion. |
| 13 June 2020 | Calgary, Alberta, Canada | A massive hailstorm with tennis-ball-sized hail pummeled northeastern Calgary, regarded as the hailstorm capital of Canada, and nearby communities. Preliminary damage estimates weigh in at least $1.2 billion, eclipsing the $400 million hailstorm event 10 years prior and becoming the fourth costliest natural disaster in Canada. |
| 1 August 2022 | Near Innisfail and Penhold, Alberta, Canada | A destructive hailstorm struck Central Alberta, in the area around Innisfail and Penhold. Notable destruction occurred to cars driving on Alberta Highway 2, in which RCMP stated over a pile-up of over 70 cars occurred. The largest hailstone in Canadian history was recorded from this event, with a hailstone being measured at 123 mm (4.8 inches) in diameter and 292.71 grams (0.6453 lb). |
| 21 June 2023 | Morrison, Colorado, US | An evening severe thunderstorm produced several inches of hail, some stones measuring up to the size of golf balls and tennis balls. Over 90 people attending a Louis Tomlinson concert at Red Rocks Amphitheater were treated on-site as a result of hail-related injuries. Seven people were hospitalized. |
| 15 July 2023 | Calgary, Alberta, Canada | Major hailstorm hit Calgary, causing tennis-ball-sized hail. It caused notable damage to CF Chinook Centre, southwest Calgary, and southeast Calgary. Major traffic jams along Calgary's highways were caused. |
| 30 May 2024 | Denver, Colorado, US | An unusually strong storm blanketed a large portion of the northeast Denver metro area in the late evening. Golf ball-sized stones damaged homes and vehicles, in an event comparable to the May 2017 hail storm. Due to the late hour the storm hit, much of the hail would not melt until the following day. The storm would cause nearly $2 billion in damages. |
| 5 August 2024 | Calgary, Alberta, Canada | A major hailstorm struck Calgary on 5 August 2024. It caused extensive damage to Calgary International Airport, and heavy damage to northwest and northeast Calgary. It is estimated to have caused over $2.8 billion in damage, and is one of the costliest hailstorms in history. |

=== Europe ===
| Date | Location | Incident |
|---|---|---|
| 13 April 1360 | Outskirts of Chartres, France | A freak hail storm struck and killed an estimated 1,000 English soldiers on Black Monday (1360) during the Hundred Years War |
| May 1411 | Wellesbourne, Warwickshire, England, UK | The first known severe hailstorm in Britain is thought to have incurred fatalities. |
| 15 May 1697 | Hitchin to Great Offley, Hertfordshire, England, UK | A H8 level hailstorm is the most intense on record in Britain, known as the 1697 Hertfordshire Hailstorm. |
| 13 July 1788 | France and Dutch Republic | Heavy damage to crops, leading to further economic turmoil in France and precipitating the French Revolution one year later. |
| 1 July 1891 | Netherlands, Germany | From Brabant and Limburg in the Netherlands, Münsterland, Weserbergland, Brandenburg. |
| 9 August 1843 | Midlands and East Anglia, Central and Southern England | One of Britain's worst ever hailstorms, possibly a supercell, caused massive destruction as hailstones reached up to 1.5 m (4.9 ft) deep in places. The storm is also believed to have spawned several tornadoes, and the exact size of the hail that fell within it is unknown. The overall damage was so great that an entire new insurance company, The General Hail Insurance Company, was formed to help cope with future hailstorms. This company would later be known as the Norwich Union. |
| 22 September 1935 | Newport, Monmouthshire to Mundesley, Norfolk, UK | A H6 level hailswath at least from points above and possibly longer is longest on record in Britain. |
| 24 May 1937 | Belgrade, Yugoslavia | The hailstorm lasted for 5 minutes, causing heavy damage and killing many sparrows. Streets were covered in some places with 90 cm (3.0 ft) of icy slush. The largest pieces were over 2 cm (0.79 in) in diameter. |
| 1–2 July 1968 | England and Wales | Mineral dust blowing in from the Sahara met cold, moist air over the British Isles, forming unusually large hailstones (at least 7.5 centimetres (3.0 in) across, possibly 10 centimetres (3.9 in)) around the dust. In the thunderstorms that ensued, hail piled up to 45 centimetres (18 in) deep and many towns flooded. |
| 12 July 1984 | Munich, Bavaria, Germany | Tennis ball-sized hail fell on Munich and surrounding areas on this date. It was the greatest loss event in the history of the German insurance industry: 200,000 cars were damaged and the storm cost an estimated 3 billion Deutschmark. For years afterwards people jokingly referred to those cars whose bodywork was not repaired as 'Munich Design'. |
| 28–29 June 2006 | Villingen-Schwenningen and suburbs, Baden-Württemberg, Germany | Supercell thunderstorms, severe damage by grapefruit-sized hailstones, causing €150 million damage, more than 100 injuries. |
| 27–28 July 2013 | Reutlingen and Pfortzheim, Baden-Württemberg; Wolfsburg and Hanover, Lower Saxony | A series of hailstorms caused large amounts of damage in both Northern and Southern Germany. The total cost of these hailstorms has been estimated to be €3.6 billion. In Reutlingen alone around 70 people received minor injuries. |
| 9 June 2014 | France, Belgium, Germany | Heavy Hailstorm Ela caused significant damages, with damage claims reaching up to €2.3 billion for France, Belgium and Germany. |
| 8 July 2014 | Sofia, Bulgaria | 100 million levs in damage claims (c. €51 million) |
| 20 June 2016 | Pančevo, Belgrade, Serbia | Strong hailstorm with an occurrence of tornado in Pančevo. Baseball to softball-sized hail. |
| 28 May 2019 | Zalău, Romania | Severe supercell storm with hail the size of eggs smashed cars' windows |

=== Asia ===
| Date | Location | Incident |
|---|---|---|
| Circa 9th century | Roopkund, Uttarakhand, India | Several hundred pilgrims were killed by a hailstorm in Roopkund. |
| 12 March – 19 April 1490 | Qingyang, China | The 1490 Qingyang event may have been due to a large comet breaking up in the atmosphere, or a hail storm. Sources generally considered reliable say more than 10,000 killed, but the official History of Ming does not give a number of casualties. |
| 30 April 1888 | Moradabad (Uttar Pradesh), Northern India | One of the deadliest hailstorms of all time killed at least 230 people, and over 1600 sheep and goats, in Uttar Pradesh. The hailstones were reportedly as big as oranges, and in some areas piled up to 2 ft (0.61 m) high. No warning system existed in 1888 and therefore the death toll of this event was exceptionally high. |
| 14 April 1986 | Gopalganj, Bangladesh | At least 92 people were killed in Gopalganj by some of the heaviest hailstones ever recorded, which were the size of grapefruits and weighed around 1.02 kg (2.25 lb) each. |
| 19 July 2002 | Henan Province, the People's Republic of China | 25 dead and hundreds injured. |
| 3–4 May 2022 | Widely Takasaki, Fujioka, Fukaya, Kumagaya, Ichikawa, eastern Honshu, Japan | According to Japan Meteorological Agency official figures, a freak storm occurred between 13:00 and 18:00 local time. This was due to the 15–20 degrees (C) temperature difference between altitudes above 10,000 meters and sea level. Tennis ball, table tennis ball, golf ball size hail and extremely heavy rain fell widespread in the Kanto area, damaging agriculture, personal vehicles, houses, and buildings. 93 people were injured in Gunma Prefecture, according to Japan Fire and Management Disaster Agency. |
| 16 April 2025 | Islamabad, Pakistan | Reportedly, the predicted hailstorm started late-afternoon and lasted for about 35 minutes which cooled down the heat wave and humidity level, but hail size was up to that of tennis ball; a rare case. The storm resulted in denting several cars and breaking their windscreens. Many windows and solar panels on the building structures, including Faisal Masjid, were also cracked. Tree branches and electric feeders were also damaged, causing traffic havoc and citywide electricity breakdown. City vicinity also faced thunderstorms. |

=== South America ===
| Date | Location | Incident |
|---|---|---|
| June 1, 2016 | Rio Claro, Brazil | Massive hailstorm with huge hailstones, which damaged cars, windows and roofs. |

=== Africa ===
| Date | Location | Incident |
|---|---|---|
| 1 November 1985 | Pretoria, Transvaal, South Africa | Major hailstorm striking central Pretoria and surrounding areas. Damage estimated at R400m. |

=== Australia ===
| Date | Location | Incident |
|---|---|---|
| 1 January 1947 | Sydney, New South Wales, Australia | 1947 Sydney hailstorm: Early in the afternoon, a storm cell that later formed into a supercell thunderstorm swept in from the south west dropping hailstones larger than 8 cm in diameter over eastern-south west Sydney, inner west, CBD and the eastern suburbs. hundreds of people were caught on Sydney's beaches as the Hailstorm reached the coast line with many knocked unconscious. This event adjusted for inflation caused A$45 million in damages. |
| 18 January 1985 | Brisbane, Queensland, Australia | Late in the afternoon, a supercell thunderstorm swept in from the west dropping hailstones as large as 6 cm (2.4 in) over parts of the city. A wind gust of over 180 km/h (110 mph) was recorded at Brisbane airport and 57 mm (2.2 in) of rain recorded in 15 minutes at the same location. The 30 minutes of destruction caused A$300 million (A$1.7 billion in 2007 adjusted dollars) damage to vehicles and buildings. This rates as the 5th most costly insured event in Australia since 1968. |
| 18 March 1990 | Sydney, New South Wales, Australia | Damaging hailstorm across large swaths of metropolitan Sydney. |
| 14 April 1999 | Sydney, New South Wales, Australia | 1999 Sydney hailstorm: 20,000 properties and 40,000 vehicles were damaged during the storm with more than 25 aircraft damaged at Sydney Airport. One person was killed while fishing after getting struck by lightning and several other people were injured. At A$1.5 billion (A$3.3 billion in 2007 adjusted dollars), it was the costliest hailstorm to hit an Australian populated city. The largest stone measured was 9.5 cm (3.7 in). |
| 9 December 2007 | Sydney, New South Wales, Australia | Supercell thunderstorms caused immense damage in the North and Western Suburbs of Sydney. Worst hit were the suburbs of Blacktown, Castle Hill, and neighbouring Baulkham Hills. Hail stones the size of golf balls damaged cars, windows, and homes. |
| 6–7 March 2010 | Melbourne, Victoria, Australia | 2010 Victorian storms: Heavy rain and large hail across much of Victoria lead to flash flooding in central Melbourne, roofs collapsing at Southern Cross station and Docklands Stadium, and power cuts to over 120,000 households around Victoria. 40,000 insurance claims for over $500 million were lodged. |
| 22 March 2010 | Perth, Western Australia, Australia | The hailstorm that struck after a long dry spell lasted only a few minutes but caused damage to many houses, a number of hospitals and schools, and an airport terminal. The storm damaged thousands of cars, cut power lines and left 150,000 houses and many traffic lights without power. The storm also caused a landslip at King's Park. |
| 27 November 2014 | Brisbane, Queensland, Australia | The 2014 Brisbane hailstorm caused severe damage to many buildings and cars in the city. It struck central parts of the city during the afternoon peak period. Around 40 people were injured. Three months after the event it was estimated that the storm caused $1.1 billion worth of damage. |
| 20 November 2019 | Timaru, New Zealand | The 2019 Timaru hailstorm was one of New Zealand's costliest weather events in decades. Most damaged was caused to cars. |
| 20 January 2020 | Canberra, Australian Capital Territory, Australia | The 2020 Canberra hailstorm caused severe damage to cars, buildings, trees and local wildlife. It struck just after midday and passed in a South Westerly direction across the city. Areas of most impact were the inner city suburbs. Many cars were written off by the damage. It also affected the local wildlife taking shelter in the trees with leaves and branches broken by the ferocity of the hail. |
| 30 October – 1 November 2020 | Brisbane, Queensland, Australia | The 2020 Brisbane Hailstorms caused major havoc in the southern and western suburbs of the city, with some isolated areas to the north. Damage in excess of AU$50M was recorded on 1 November alone, possibly the day with the most severe weather. Heavily affected suburbs included Coomera, Victoria Point, Ipswich, Amberley, Brisbane's CBD, Redcliffe, and Springfield, which recorded 14 cm hailstones. The event signified the beginning of a forecast La Niña weather phenomenon, in the wake of its destruction. |

== Largest by country ==
- 15 March 1808 – Somerset, England, United Kingdom ~70 mm (2.8 in) "hailstones, touching perhaps 100 mm in places, causing great damage. Indeed, some in Somerset were reported to be over a foot long (at 333 mm)" and up to 220 g.
- 29 June 1917 − Large hailstones including one that was the size of a pumpkin – 29.4 cm (11.6 in) across and weighing 3.4 kg (7.5 lb) – fell in a rice field in Kumagaya, Saitama Prefecture, leaving five holes ranging in size from 10 to 60 cm (4 to 24 in) and resulting in one fatality, according to the Japan Meteological Agency and a report confirmed by the government of the Saitama Prefecture.
- 27 August 1973 – Cedoux, Saskatchewan, Canada, nicknamed Gawel stone at a diameter of heaviest at and 290 g (10 oz)
- 19 July 2023 – Carmignano di Brenta, Veneto, Northern Italy ~16 cm (6.3 in)
- (Alberta) 31 July 1987 – during Edmonton Tornado official larger than 7.8 cm (3.1 in), reported
- 14 April 1986 – Gopalganj District, Bangladesh (1.02 kg (2.25 lb))
- 19 October 2021 – Yalboroo, Queensland, Australia (16 cm)
- 23 July 2010 – Vivian, South Dakota, United States (~8 in (200 mm) diameter & ~18.62 in (473 mm) circumference)
- 28 July 2013 – Reutlingen, Baden-Württemberg, Germany (14.1 cm diameter & 360–380 g weight)
- 25 September 2024 – Bagé, Rio Grande do Sul, Brazil (14.6 cm diameter, officialized by PREVOTS)

== See also ==
- List of weather records#Hail
