= 2019 Timaru hailstorm =

Hailstorm in New Zealand

Meteorological history
- Formed: 20 November 2019

Hailstorm

Overall effects
- Damage: US$122 million
- Areas affected: Timaru, New Zealand

The 2019 Timaru hailstorm occurred in Timaru, in the Canterbury Region of New Zealand, on 20 November 2019. Lasting about ten minutes, it produced hailstones the size of golf balls and turned the streets white. It caused insurers to pay about NZ$171 million (US$122 million) in damage, mostly to cars, becoming one of New Zealand's costliest natural disasters. At the time of the event, it was the country's fifth costliest natural disaster since records began, and the costliest weather event in the 21st century. Cyclone Gabrielle surpassed the cost of the hailstorm in 2023, by a large margin.

== Storm ==
The hailstorm started before the noon of 20 November 2019 and lasted for about 10 minutes. The hailstones were up to the size of golf balls and caused the streets to become covered in "carpets of white".

== Damage ==
The hailstones caused widespread building damage throughout Timaru, and some businesses had to close for the day. Fire and Emergency New Zealand received 30 call outs from noon to 2.40 pm, 21 of which relating to hail or rain damage. The hail caused one person to go to hospital after a minor injury.

About 8,000 to 12,000 cars were damaged in Timaru. This included dents, damage to mirrors, tail lights and spoilers, and smashed windscreens. This compromised the structural integrity of some of the cars, causing Warrants of Fitness to fail. Insurance companies created a car repair shop in Washdyke and another in 'the south end of town', and people came overseas from Australia and Brazil. Timaru experienced a car shortage, and in the following year, new car registrations in the Timaru District had increased by 62.7 per cent.

Hundreds of black-billed gulls and white-fronted terns had either died or been severely injured at the Rangitata River mouth. Several eggs had also broken. Crops were damaged on a widespread scale. Farmers often do not insure their crops because they consider it 'expensive', although there is a compulsory levy on wheat that is used to protect the crops.

The hail caused windows and glass houses to smash, roofs to become leaky, skylights to get damaged, and holes to appear in house guttering. Timaru Boys' High School and Roncalli College had roof damage and the cupolas and dome of Timaru's Sacred Heart Basilica experienced severe damage. Work to replace the copper tiling of them finished in August 2024.

== Cost ==
Insurers paid out about NZ$171 milion (US$122 million), which was more than the preliminary estimate of $83 million in March 2020. Of this cost, $86.2 million (12,078 claims) related to motor vehicles, $59.6 million (5,791 claims) for 'house and contents', $23.2 million (1,047 claims) for 'commercial', $73,759 (15 claims) for 'marine', $171,701 (10 claims) for 'crops' and $1.7 million (99 claims) for 'other'. The cost was several thousand dollars for each person in Timaru.

At the time of the event, it was fifth costliest natural disaster in New Zealand since the Insurance Council of New Zealand's records began in 1968. The only disasters that were more costly were the 2010 and 2011 Christchurch earthquakes, the 2016 Kaikōura earthquake, the 1987 Edgecumbe earthquake and the sinking of Wahine in 1968. It was also, at the time, the country's costliest weather event in the 21st century, with the second costliest being the 2004 lower North Island storms, which cost $148 million. However, those storms covered a much greater area than the Timaru hailstorm. The cost of the Timaru event was surpassed in 2023 by Cyclone Gabrielle by a large margin, the cost being in the billions.

== See also ==
- List of costly or deadly hailstorms
- List of natural disasters in New Zealand
