= 2014 Brisbane hailstorm =

Hailstorm in Australia

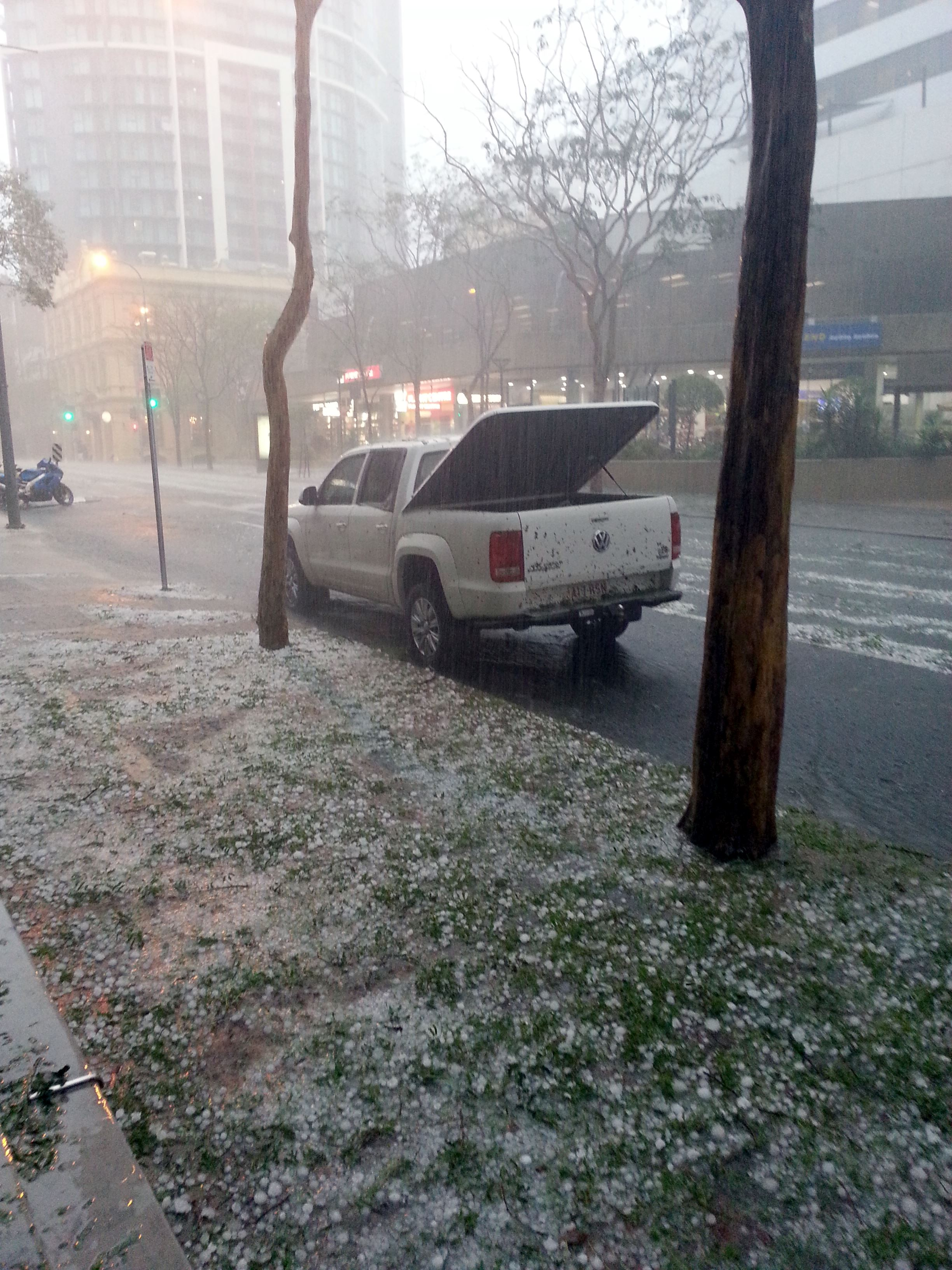
- Hail along Mary Street

Meteorological history
- Formed: 27 November 2014

Mesoscale convective system
- Highest winds: 144 mph (232 km/h)

Overall effects
- Damage: AU$1.1 billion
- Areas affected: Brisbane

The 2014 Brisbane hailstorm struck Brisbane, the capital city of Queensland, Australia on 27 November 2014. The storm caused severe damage to many buildings and cars in the city. Around 40 people were injured. Wind speeds of 141 km/h (88 mph) were recorded with multiple reports of hail in the city and surrounding areas.

== Climatology and conditions ==
Warm, humid air over South East Queensland was hit by a cooler southerly change causing instability. Multiple cells formed near the New South Wales border and tracked northwards, with one storm intensifying into a strong supercell.

== Progression of the storm ==
The storm struck during peak hour. It was of short duration, lasting just half an hour. Wind gusts of 141 km/h (88 mph) were recorded at Archerfield. While supercell storms form every year in the region it was rare for one to strike the central parts of Brisbane. Reports of giant hail were widespread across the city. The storm continued to track north, threatening suburbs in the Moreton Bay region. It passed near Redcliffe and North Lakes, around 30 or 40 minutes after the city impact, not causing anywhere near as much damage. By this time it had turned north east, and eventually shifted out to sea not long before dusk.

== Aftermath ==
A senior forecaster at the Bureau of Meteorology described the storm as the worst in a decade. More than 100,000 homes lost power supply. 642 power-lines were brought down. Around 2,000 homes experienced roof damaged caused by hail. 39 people were injured with 12 treated at hospitals. A number of planes were flipped over at Archerfield Airport. More than 12 schools were closed following the storm. Brisbane City Council and State Government buildings suffered $50 million worth of damage.

In mid February 2015, it was estimated the storm caused $1.1 billion worth of damage. Many drivers were caught unaware and unable to escape the hail. According to the Insurance Council of Australia 100,000 insurance claims have been lodged with almost two thirds for vehicles. Hail-damaged cars were expected to undergo repairs until the end of 2015.

== See also ==
- List of costly or deadly hailstorms
- Severe storms in Australia
