= Pseudo-cold front =

Supercell inflow/downdraft boundary

In meteorology, a pseudo-cold front is a boundary between a supercell's inflow region and the rear flank downdraft. It usually extends outward from a mesocyclone center, usually toward the south or southwest, and is characterized by advancing of the downdraft air toward the inflow region. It is a particular form of gust front.

== See also ==
- Pseudo-warm front
