= Pseudo-warm front =

Boundary

A pseudo-warm front is a boundary between the in-flow region and the forward-flank downdraft of a supercell. It can either be stationary or move in a northeasterly direction. If it were stationary it would technically be a pseudo-stationary front.

== See also ==
- Pseudo-cold front
- Warm front
