= 1697 Hertfordshire Hailstorm =

Weather event in England

On May 15, 1697, a severe hailstorm tracked south-westwards between the towns of Hitchin (Hertfordshire) and Potton (Bedfordshire) in Southern England. The storm moved slowly, beginning at 9 am and finishing by 2 pm local time. The parent storm's total track length was at least 25 km (16 mi) long. This hailstorm is widely considered to be the worst hailstorm ever documented in the United Kingdom, with the largest hail ever measured in addition. Widespread damage to property was reported where the hailstorm had passed through, with slate roof tiles smashed to pieces and resulting in at least 1 death.

This particular hailstorm was assessed by TORRO as having reached "H8" intensity on their hailstorm destructivity scale. It is the only H8 hailstorm to have occurred in the UK, and is only joined by a few H7 rated storms in the country's recorded history. A H8 hailstorm is described by TORRO as being "destructive" and contains hail large enough to damage airplanes. Anything above a H9 rating is considered a "super hailstorm".

Just 5 days prior to the 1697 Hertfordshire hailstorm, another destructive hailstorm had travelled over 85 km (53 mi) from St. Asaph (Denbighshire) to Blackburn (Lancashire). This hailstorm is analysed by TORRO to have attained a H7 rating, making it joint second place for the worst hailstorm in British history.

All hailstorms rated H6+ and above in the UK since 1650
Date	Location	Hail destructivity index (H1-10)	Path length
30 June 1687	Alvanley, Cheshire	H6+	Unknown.
10 May 1697	St. Asaph, Denbighshire to Blackburn, Lancashire	H7	85 km (53 mi)
15 May 1697	Hitchin, Hertfordshire to Potton, Bedfordshire	H8	25 km (16 mi)
14 July 1719	Seighford, Staffordshire	H6+	36 km (22 mi)
5 August 1761	Benfield, Northamptonshire	H6+	Unknown.
19 August 1763	Tunbridge Wells to Isle of Sheppey, Kent	H7	65 km (40 mi)
18 August 1797	Helford Passage, Cornwall	H6+	Unknown
19 August 1800	Upper Heyford, Oxfordshire to Clophill, Bedfordshire	H7	60 km (37 mi)
15 July 1808	Poyntington, Dorset to Monmouth, Monmouthshire	H6-7	95 km (59 mi)
24 July 1818	Stronsay, Orkney to Ronaldsay, Orkney	H7	32 km (20 mi)
9 August 1843	Stow-on-the-Wold, Gloucestershire to Horsey, Norfolk	H7	225 km (140 mi)
3 August 1879	Teddington, London to Watford, Hertfordshire	H6-7	30 km (19 mi)
8 July 1893	Baldersby, North Yorkshire to Barnard Castle, Co. Durham	H6-7	30 km (19 mi)
24 June 1897	Slough, Buckinghamshire to Brightlingsea, Essex	H7	115 km (71 mi)
4 July 1915	Highbridge, Somerset to Winslow, Buckinghamshire	H6-7	165 km (103 mi)
5 September 1958	W. Wittering, West Sussex to Maldon, Essex	H6-7	150 km (93 mi)

The worst hailstorm in British history is the 1697 Hertfordshire hailstorm. The longest tracked hailstorm ever documented in the UK was the 22 September 1935 storm which travelled from Newport, Gwent to Mundesley, Norfolk - a total distance of 335 km (208 mi). The last hailstorm in the UK to receive a rating of H6+ or above was the 5 September 1958 storm, to date since, there has not been any storm rated above H6.

== Measurements ==
The hailstorm tracked for at least 25 km (16 mi) over the towns of Hitchin, Potton and Offley. The largest hail is believed to have fallen over Offley, which sits to the southwest of Hitchin. The largest measured hail had a circumference of 343 mm (13.5 in), however anecdotal reports suggest hailstones may have reached as large as 445 mm (17.5 in), which would make these hailstones among some of the largest to have ever been documented. These circumferences correlate to hail diameters of between 110 and 140 mm (4.3 and 5.5 in). The pieces of ice were described as being of irregular shape, with some oval shaped, some rounded and some flat. In Hitchin, the ice reportedly piled up to 1.5 m (4.9 ft) high. Local reports suggest that the hail was as large as a man's head. At Hitchin, a report was made of a hail diameter of an astonishing 60 cm (24 in), if accurate, this would make it the largest hailstone ever to be documented as having fallen anywhere in the world, by far.

== Damages ==
The hailstorms slow movement meant that it caused severe damage, especially around Hitchin and Offley. During the storm's passage, at least one person was killed due to the hail, a young shepherd caught outside during the falling of the bowling ball sized hailstones. The hailstones came into contact with the Earth with such speed that they 'tore up the ground' and were powerful enough to split great Oak trees down the middle. Any tiles or windows on houses were easily smashed by the stones.

Widespread destruction was reported to crops, with every plantation 'felled before it [the hailstorm]', and people found precarious shelter in their homes. As well as one fatality, one person was found bruised all over, presumably unconscious. Pigeons, rooks and smaller birds were found brought down, as well as fatalities to livestock such as chickens.
