= Fort Worth Mayfest =

Community festival in Texas, US

Mayfest is an annual four-day community festival in Fort Worth, Texas, United States, that began in 1973, held on 33 acres of Trinity Park. The festival attracts about 200,000 people during the first weekend of May. The event also includes the Mayfest Run, which has a USATF certified 10K, 5K and 1K Fun Run winding through Trinity Park along the Trinity River. Mayfest has free admission for senior citizens on Thursday and for members of the armed forces on Sunday.

== History ==
After a serious flood of the Trinity River within Fort Worth in 1949, levees were built to prevent a recurrence of the flooding. In 1968 Phyllis Tilley and the Junior League of Fort Worth undertook the beautification of the Trinity River area.

By 1973 the area around the river was improved enough that a celebration was held in Fort Worth's Trinity Park. This inaugural two-day festival celebration was called the Trinity River Festival-Mayfest and included music, food, art booths, and family entertainment. The festival was put together by four organizations: the Junior League of Fort Worth, Inc., Fort Worth Parks and Community Services Department, Streams and Valleys, Inc., and the Tarrant Regional Water District. Mayfest became an annual event, and in 1987 it was incorporated as a nonprofit 501(c)(3) organization.

In 1995, the festival was interrupted by a severe storm, which included softball-sized hail and a flash flood.

In 2009 the festival was cancelled as a precaution against the H1N1 virus pandemic; the last-minute cancellation caused financial difficulties for the festival organization.

The 2015 festival was one of the largest, and included water sports.

In 2016 a severe storm shut down the festival on Friday. The area was under a tornado watch.

The COVID-19 pandemic caused Mayfest to go on hiatus since 2020.

== Current operation ==
As of 2016, Mayfest, Inc.'s board of directors and staff manage the day-to-day operations, raising funds and celebrating the parks and river.

A central volunteer committee consisting of about 75 members largely organizes the Mayfest festival. This group begins work on the festival a year in advance. The festival is staffed with volunteers from the Junior League of Fort Worth, Inc. and the Fort Worth community; about 2,000 volunteers help to operate the four-day festival event.

The Art & Gift Market Area showcases about 60 booths of local arts, crafts and gifts as well as a School Art Competition awarding cash prizes. There is a children's area with about 20 booths of free activities for children ages 3 to 12. The Range Area has entertainment and carnival rides; the Zone Area includes the giant human maze, Texas Parks and Wildlife booths about the outdoors of Texas, and the Humane Society of North Texas pet adoption. The Riverbank Area has music entertainment and activities, and there is live music and performing arts entertainment from the greater Fort Worth area and beyond. About 135 groups on seven stages perform at Mayfest each year, Visitors are offered a selection of food and beverages.

All profits from the festival, which totalled $6.5 million by 2013, are used by three founding partner organizations to support community wide cultural programs, to maintain Worth's city parks, and to beautify and develop recreational programs along the Trinity River and its riverbanks.
