= Tornado =

Violently rotating column of air

- A tornado approaching Elie, Manitoba, Canada on June 22, 2007
- Area of occurrence: Every continent except Antarctica
- Season: Any, though primarily in spring or summer
- Effect: Wind damage

A tornado, also known as a twister, is a rapidly rotating column of air that extends vertically from the surface of the Earth to the base of a cumulonimbus or cumulus cloud. Tornadoes are often (but not always) visible in the form of a condensation funnel originating from the cloud base, with a cloud of rotating debris and dust close to the ground. Most tornadoes have wind speeds less than 180 kilometers per hour (110 miles per hour), are about 80 meters (250 feet) across, and travel several kilometers (a few miles) before dissipating. The most extreme tornadoes can attain wind speeds of more than 480 kilometers per hour (300 mph), can be more than 3 kilometers (2 mi) in diameter, and can stay on the ground for more than 100 km (62 mi).

Types of tornadoes include the multiple-vortex tornado, landspout, and waterspout. Waterspouts are characterized by a spiraling funnel-shaped wind current, connecting to a large cumulus or cumulonimbus cloud. They are generally classified as non-supercellular tornadoes that develop over bodies of water, but there is disagreement about whether to classify them as true tornadoes. These spiraling columns of air often develop in tropical areas close to the equator, and are less common at high latitudes. Similar phenomena in nature include the gustnado, dust devil, fire whirl, and steam devil.

Tornadoes most commonly occur in North America, particularly in central and southeastern regions of the United States colloquially known as Tornado Alley; the United States has by far the most tornadoes of any country in the world. Tornadoes also occur in South Africa, much of Europe (except most of the Alps), western and eastern Australia, New Zealand, Bangladesh and adjacent eastern India, Japan, the Philippines, and southeastern South America (Uruguay and Argentina). Tornadoes can be detected before or as they occur through the use of pulse-Doppler radar by recognizing patterns in velocity and reflectivity data, such as hook echoes or debris balls, as well as through the efforts of storm spotters.

== Rating ==
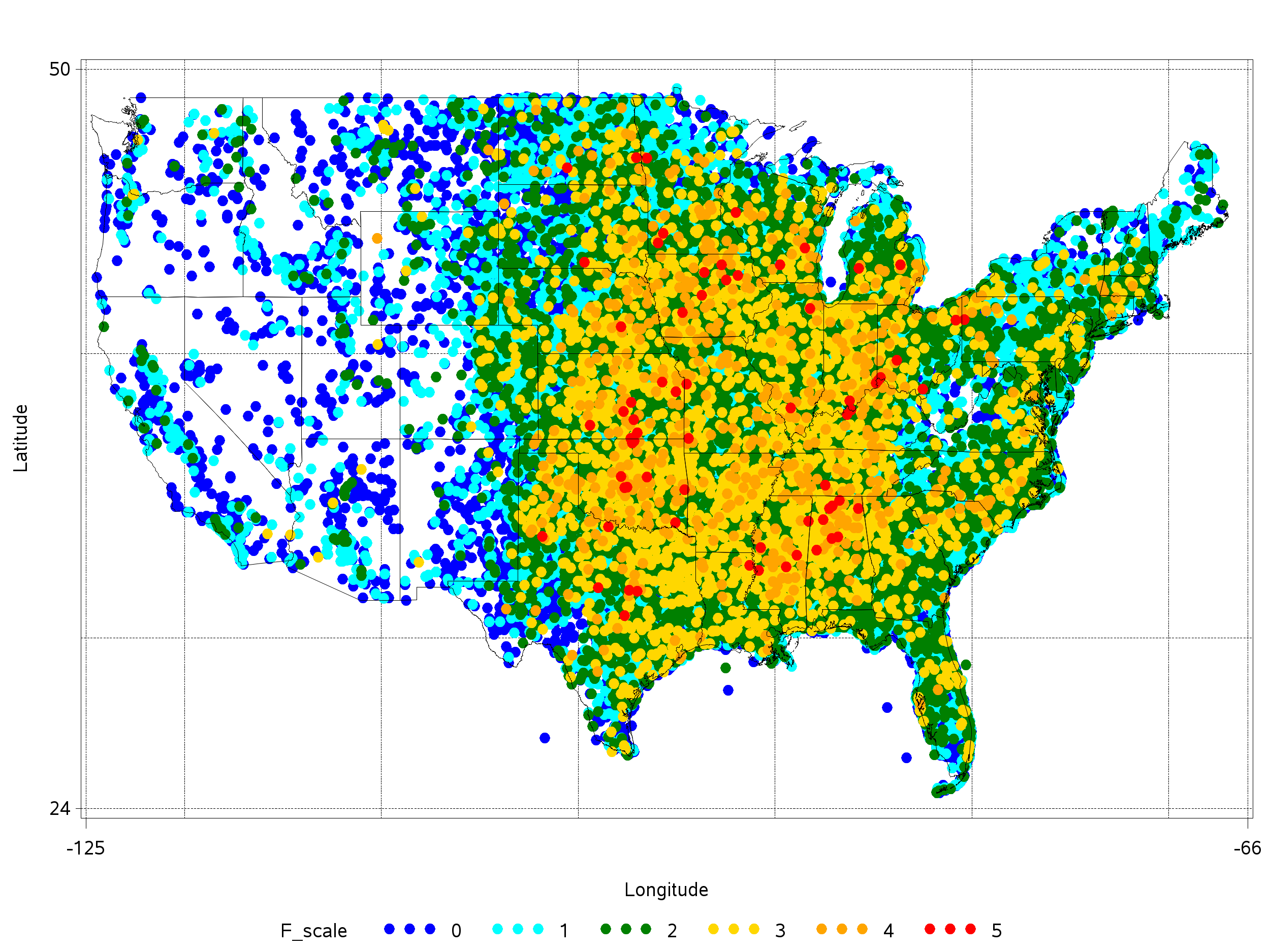
Tornadoes in the US, 1950–2013, highest F-scale on top, source NOAA Storm Prediction Center.

There are several scales for rating the strength of tornadoes. The Fujita scale rates tornadoes by damage caused and has been replaced in some countries by the updated Enhanced Fujita Scale. An F0 or EF0 tornado, the weakest category, damages trees, but not substantial structures. An F5 or EF5 tornado, the strongest category, rips buildings off their foundations and can deform large skyscrapers. The similar TORRO scale ranges from T0 for extremely weak tornadoes to T11 for the most powerful known tornadoes. The International Fujita scale is also used to rate the intensity of tornadoes and other wind events based on the severity of the damage they cause. Doppler radar data, photogrammetry, and ground swirl patterns (trochoidal marks) may also be analyzed to determine intensity and assign a rating.

== Etymology ==
The word tornado comes from the Spanish tronada (meaning 'thunderstorm', past participle of tronar 'to thunder', itself in turn from the Latin tonāre 'to thunder'). The metathesis of the r and o in the English spelling was influenced by the Spanish tornado (past participle of tornar 'to twist, turn', from Latin tornō 'to turn').

A linguistically related convective wind phenomena, that unlike the relatively small concentrated area of a tornado, is the widespread, straight-line derecho (/dəˈreɪtʃoʊ/, from Spanish: derecho [deˈɾetʃo], 'straight').

== Definitions ==
A tornado is a violently rotating column of air, in contact with the ground, either pendant from a cumuliform cloud or underneath a cumuliform cloud, and often (but not always) visible as a funnel cloud. For a vortex to be classified as a tornado, it must be in contact with both the ground and the cloud base. The term is not precisely defined; for example, there is disagreement as to whether separate touchdowns of the same funnel constitute separate tornadoes. Tornado refers to the vortex of wind, not the condensation cloud.

Tornados are sometimes colloquially referred to as cyclones. However, in meteorology, the word cyclone specifically refers to a large weather system that rotates around a center of low atmospheric pressure counterclockwise in the Northern Hemisphere and clockwise in the Southern Hemisphere. Cyclones do not feature cloud funnels.

=== Funnel cloud ===
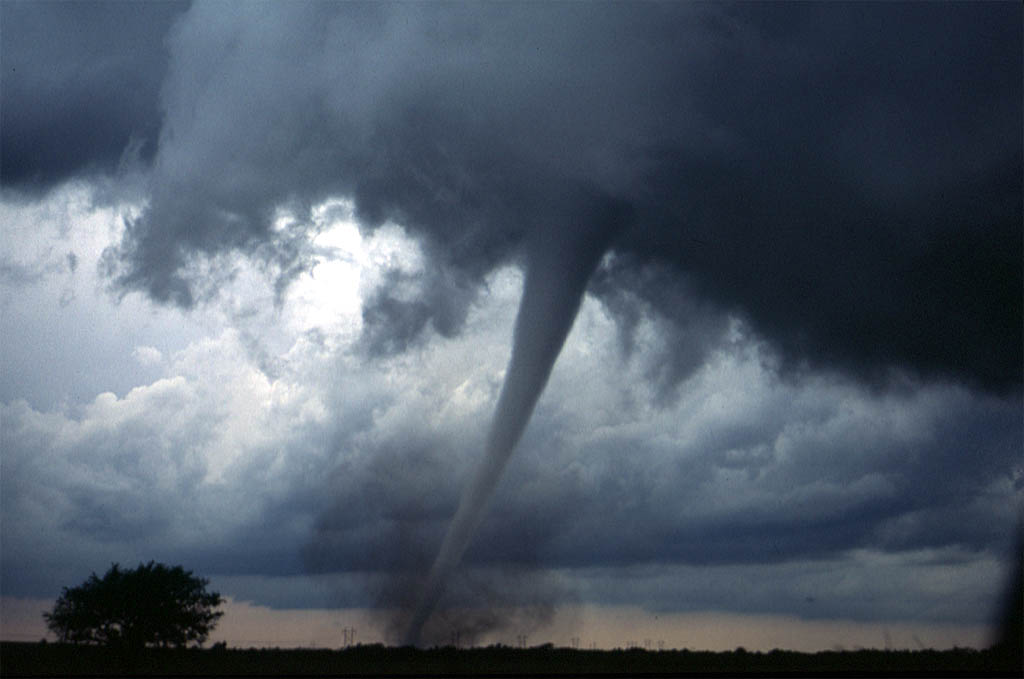
A tornado near Anadarko, Oklahoma, 1999. The funnel is the thin tube reaching from the cloud to the ground. The lower part of this tornado is surrounded by a translucent dust cloud, kicked up by the tornado's strong winds at the surface. The wind of the tornado has a much wider radius than the funnel itself.

A tornado is not necessarily visible; however, the intense low pressure caused by the high wind speeds (as described by Bernoulli's principle) and rapid rotation (due to cyclostrophic balance) usually cause water vapor in the air to condense into cloud droplets due to adiabatic cooling. This results in the formation of a visible funnel cloud or condensation funnel.

There is some disagreement over the definition of a funnel cloud and a condensation funnel. According to the Glossary of Meteorology, a funnel cloud is any rotating cloud pendant from a cumulus or cumulonimbus, and thus most tornadoes are included under this definition. Among many meteorologists, the "funnel cloud" term is strictly defined as a rotating cloud which is not associated with strong winds at the surface, and condensation funnel is a broad term for any rotating cloud below a cumuliform cloud.

Tornadoes often begin as funnel clouds with no associated strong winds at the surface, and not all funnel clouds evolve into tornadoes. Most tornadoes produce strong winds at the surface while the visible funnel is still above the ground, so it is difficult to discern the difference between a funnel cloud and a tornado from a distance.

=== Outbreaks and families ===
Occasionally, a single storm will produce more than one tornado, either simultaneously or in succession. Multiple tornadoes produced by the same storm cell are referred to as a "tornado family". Several tornadoes are sometimes spawned from the same large-scale storm system. If there is no break in activity, this is considered a tornado outbreak (although the term "tornado outbreak" has various definitions). A period of several successive days with tornado outbreaks in the same general area (spawned by multiple weather systems) is a tornado outbreak sequence, occasionally called an extended tornado outbreak.

== Characteristics ==
=== Size and shape ===
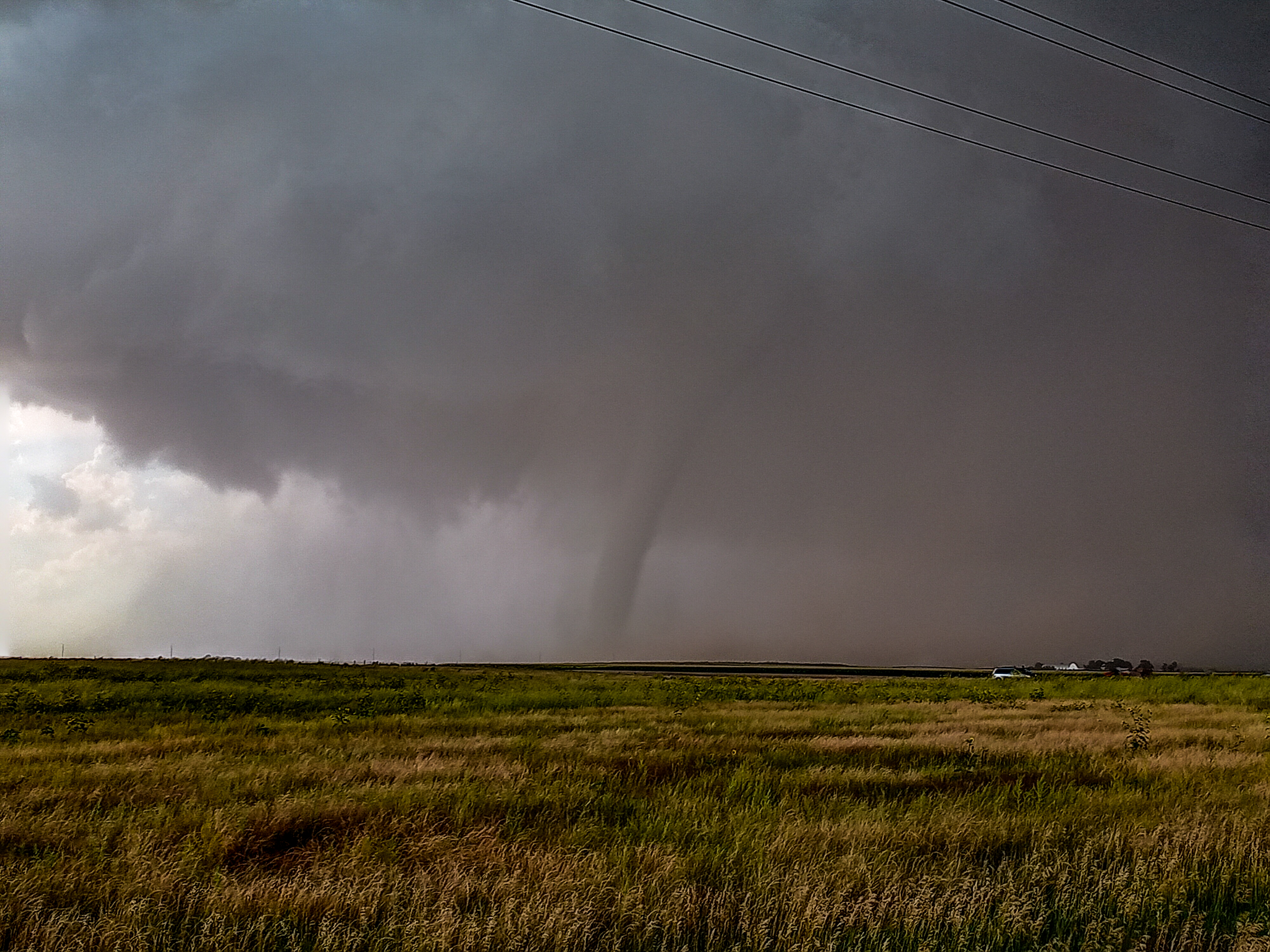
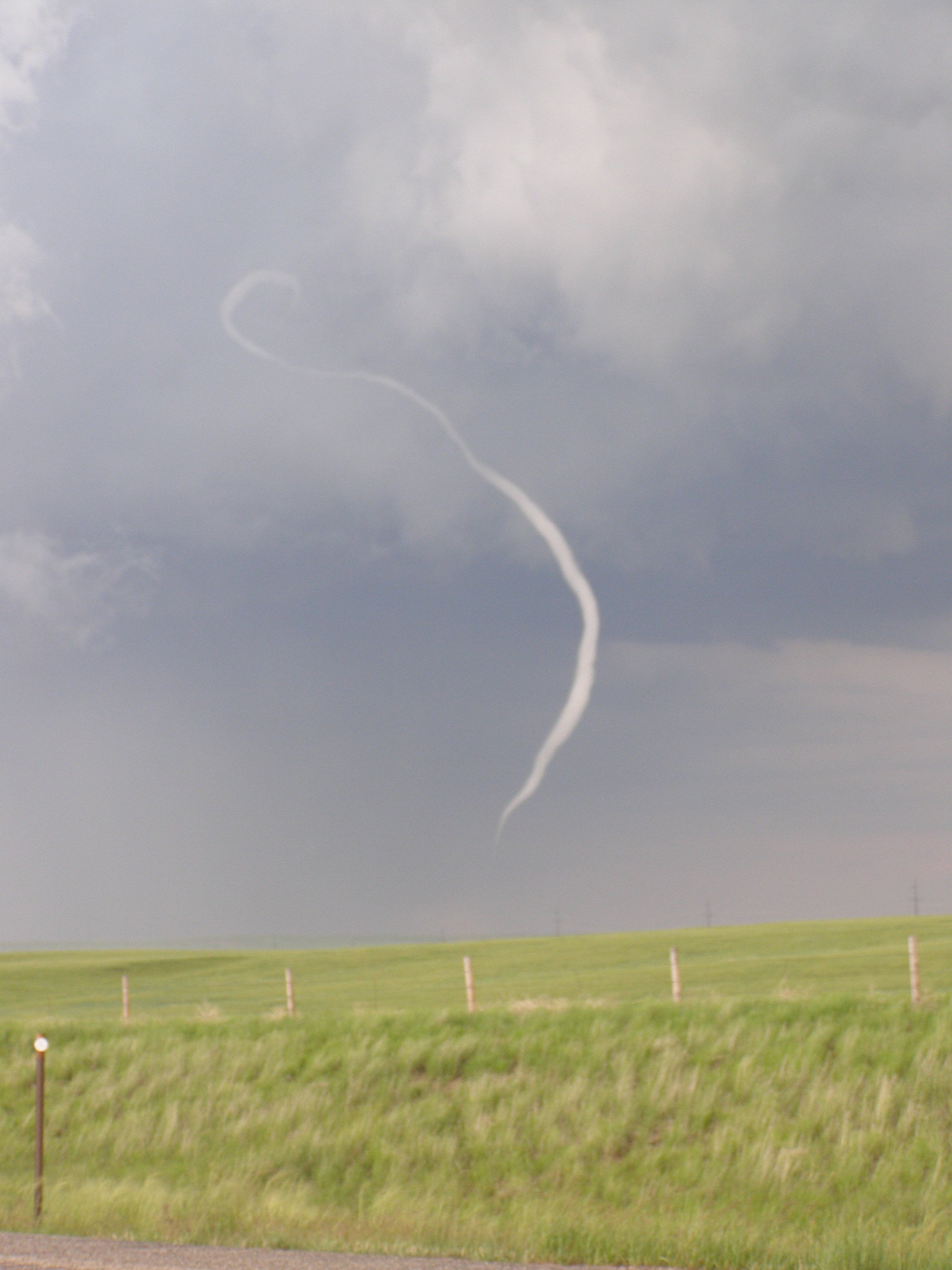
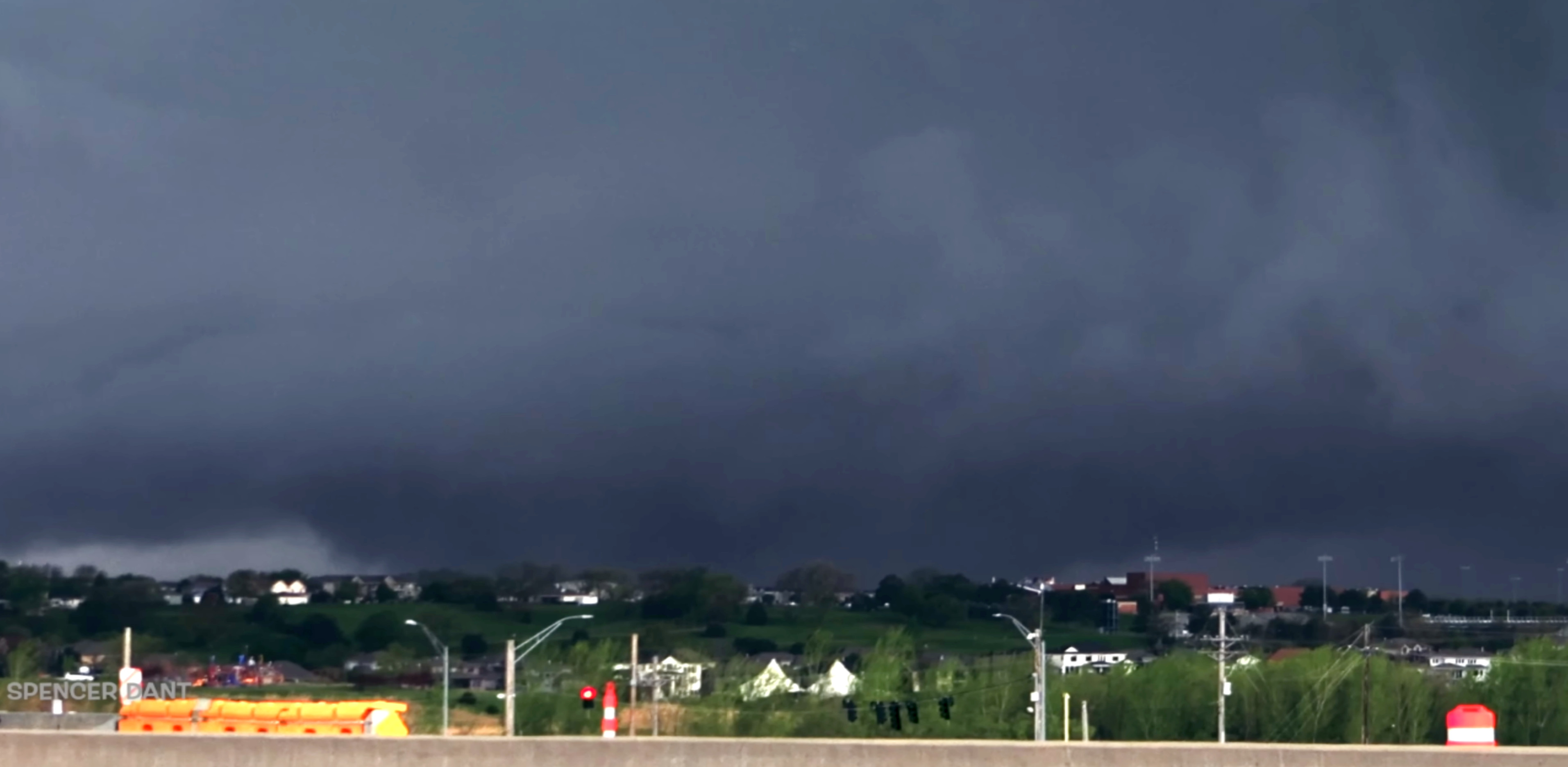
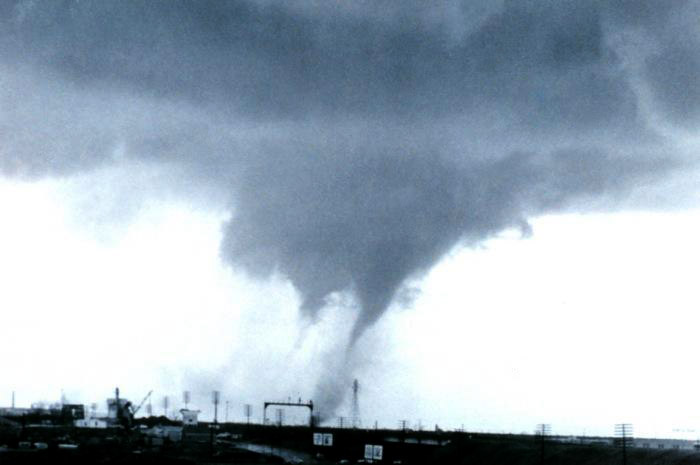
Clockwise from upper left: a stovepipe tornado, rope tornado, multiple-vortex tornado, cone tornado, and wedge tornado: common forms that tornadoes assume.

Most tornadoes take on the appearance of a narrow funnel, a few hundred meters (yards) across, with a small cloud of debris near the ground. Tornadoes may be obscured completely by rain or dust. These tornadoes are especially dangerous, as even experienced meteorologists might not see them.

Small, relatively weak landspouts may be visible only as a small swirl of dust on the ground. Although the condensation funnel may not extend all the way to the ground, if associated surface winds are greater than 64 km/h (40 mph), the circulation is considered a tornado. A tornado with a nearly cylindrical profile and relatively low height is sometimes referred to as a "stovepipe" tornado. Large tornadoes which appear wider than their cloud-to-ground height can look like large wedges stuck into the ground, and so are known as "wedge tornadoes" or "wedges". The "stovepipe" classification is also used for this type of tornado if it otherwise fits that profile. A wedge can be so wide that it appears to be a block of dark clouds, wider than the distance from the cloud base to the ground. Even experienced storm observers may not be able to tell the difference between a low-hanging cloud and a wedge tornado from a distance. Many, but not all major tornadoes are wedge tornados.

Tornadoes in the dissipating stage can resemble narrow tubes or ropes, and often curl or twist into complex shapes. These tornadoes are said to be "roping out", or becoming a "rope tornado". When they rope out, the length of their funnel increases, which forces the winds within the funnel to weaken due to conservation of angular momentum. Multiple-vortex tornadoes can appear as a family of swirls circling a common center, or they may be completely obscured by condensation, dust, and debris, appearing to be a single funnel.

In the United States, tornadoes are around 500 feet (150 m) across on average. However, there is a wide range of tornado sizes. Weak tornadoes, or strong yet dissipating tornadoes, can be exceedingly narrow, sometimes only a few feet or couple meters across. One tornado was reported to have a damage path only 7 feet (2.1 m) long. On the other end of the spectrum, wedge tornadoes can have a damage path a mile (1.6 km) wide or more. A tornado that affected Hallam, Nebraska on May 22, 2004, was up to 2.5 miles (4.0 km) wide at the ground, and a tornado in El Reno, Oklahoma on May 31, 2013, was approximately 2.6 miles (4.2 km) wide, the widest on record.

=== Track length ===
In the United States, the average tornado travels on the ground for 5 miles (8.0 km). However, tornadoes are capable of both much shorter and much longer damage paths: one tornado was reported to have a damage path only 7 feet (2.1 m) long, while the record-holding tornado for path length—the Tri-State Tornado, which affected parts of Missouri, Illinois, and Indiana on March 18, 1925—was on the ground continuously for 219 miles (352 km). Many tornadoes which appear to have path lengths of 100 miles (160 km) or longer are composed of a family of tornadoes which have formed in quick succession; however, there is no substantial evidence that this occurred in the case of the Tri-State Tornado. A 2007 reanalysis of the path suggests that the tornado may have begun 15 miles (24 km) further west than previously thought. In more recent years, the 2021 Western Kentucky tornado was on the ground continuously for 165.6 miles (266.5 km).

=== Appearance ===
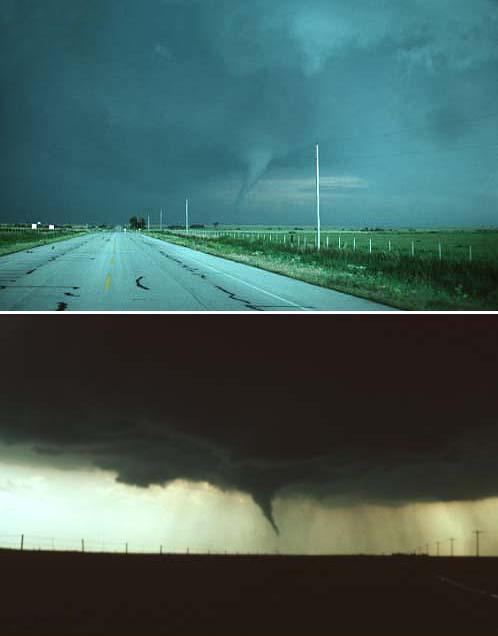
Photographs of the Waurika, Oklahoma tornado of May 30, 1976, taken at nearly the same time by two photographers. In the top picture, the tornado is lit by the sunlight focused from behind the camera, thus the funnel appears bluish. In the lower image, where the camera is facing the opposite direction, the sun is behind the tornado, giving it a dark appearance.

Tornadoes can have a wide range of colors, depending on the environment in which they form. Those that form in dry environments can be nearly invisible, marked only by swirling debris at the base of the funnel. Condensation funnels that pick up little or no debris can be gray to white. While traveling over a body of water (as a waterspout), tornadoes can turn white or even blue. Slow-moving funnels, which ingest a considerable amount of debris and dirt, are usually darker, taking on the color of debris. Tornadoes in the Great Plains can turn red because of the reddish tint of the soil, and tornadoes in mountainous areas can travel over snow-covered ground, turning white.

Lighting conditions are a major factor in the appearance of a tornado. A tornado which is "back-lit" (viewed with the sun behind it) appears very dark. The same tornado, viewed with the sun at the observer's back, may appear gray or brilliant white. Tornadoes which occur near the time of sunset can be many different colors, appearing in hues of yellow, orange, and pink.

Dust kicked up by the winds of the parent thunderstorm, heavy rain and hail, and the darkness of night are all factors that can reduce the visibility of tornadoes. Tornadoes occurring in these conditions are especially dangerous, since only weather radar observations, or possibly the sound of an approaching tornado, serve as any warning to those in the storm's path. Most significant tornadoes form under the storm's updraft base, which is rain-free, making them visible. Also, most tornadoes occur in the late afternoon, when the bright sun can penetrate even the thickest clouds.

There is mounting evidence, including Doppler on Wheels mobile radar images and eyewitness accounts, that most tornadoes have a clear, calm center with extremely low pressure, akin to the eye of tropical cyclones. Lightning is said to be the source of illumination for those who claim to have seen the interior of a tornado.

=== Rotation ===
Tornadoes normally rotate cyclonically (when viewed from above, this is counterclockwise in the Northern Hemisphere and clockwise in the Southern Hemisphere). While large-scale storms always rotate cyclonically due to the Coriolis effect, thunderstorms and tornadoes are so small that the direct influence of the Coriolis effect is negligible, as indicated by their large Rossby numbers. Supercells and tornadoes rotate cyclonically in numerical simulations even when the Coriolis effect is neglected. Low-level mesocyclones and tornadoes owe their rotation to complex processes within the supercell and ambient environment.

Approximately 1 percent of tornadoes rotate in an anticyclonic direction in the northern hemisphere. Typically, systems as weak as landspouts and gustnadoes can rotate anticyclonically, and usually only those which form on the anticyclonic shear side of the descending rear flank downdraft (RFD) in a cyclonic supercell. On rare occasions, anticyclonic tornadoes form in association with the mesoanticyclone of an anticyclonic supercell, in the same manner as the typical cyclonic tornado, or as a companion tornado either as a satellite tornado or associated with anticyclonic eddies within a supercell.

=== Sound and seismology ===
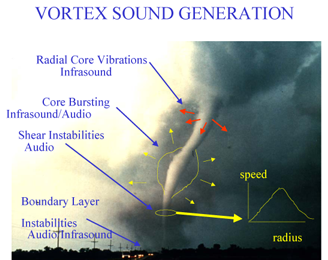
An illustration of generation of infrasound in tornadoes by the Earth System Research Laboratories's Infrasound Program

Tornadoes emit widely on the acoustics spectrum and the sounds are caused by multiple mechanisms. Various sounds of tornadoes have been reported, mostly related to familiar sounds for the witness and generally some variation of a whooshing roar. Popularly reported sounds include a freight train, rushing rapids or waterfall, a nearby jet engine, or combinations of these. Many tornadoes are not audible from much distance; the nature of and the propagation distance of the audible sound depends on atmospheric conditions and topography.

The winds of the tornado vortex and of constituent turbulent eddies, as well as airflow interaction with the surface and debris, contribute to the sounds. Funnel clouds also produce sounds. Funnel clouds and small tornadoes are reported as whistling, whining, humming, or the buzzing of innumerable bees or electricity, or more or less harmonic, whereas many tornadoes are reported as a continuous, deep rumbling, or an irregular sound of "noise".

Since many tornadoes are audible only when very near, sound is not to be thought of as a reliable warning signal for a tornado. Tornadoes are also not the only source of such sounds in severe thunderstorms; any strong, damaging wind, a severe hail volley, or continuous thunder in a thunderstorm may produce a roaring sound.

Tornadoes also produce identifiable inaudible infrasonic signatures.

Unlike audible signatures, tornadic signatures have been isolated; due to the long-distance propagation of low-frequency sound, efforts are ongoing to develop tornado prediction and detection devices with additional value in understanding tornado morphology, dynamics, and creation. Tornadoes also produce a detectable seismic signature, and research continues on isolating it and understanding the process.

=== Electromagnetic, lightning, and other effects ===
Tornadoes emit on the electromagnetic spectrum, with sferics and E-field effects detected. There are observed correlations between tornadoes and patterns of lightning. Tornadic storms do not produce more lightning than other storms and some tornadic cells never produce lightning at all. More often than not, overall cloud-to-ground (CG) lightning activity decreases as a tornado touches the surface and returns to the baseline level when the tornado dissipates. In many cases, intense tornadoes and thunderstorms exhibit an increased and anomalous dominance of positive polarity CG discharges.

In addition to winds, tornadoes also exhibit changes in atmospheric variables such as temperature, moisture, and atmospheric pressure. For example, on June 24, 2003, near Manchester, South Dakota, a probe measured a 100-millibar (100 hPa; 3.0 inHg) pressure decrease. The pressure dropped gradually as the vortex approached then dropped extremely rapidly to 850 mbar (850 hPa; 25 inHg) in the core of the violent tornado before rising rapidly as the vortex moved away, resulting in a V-shape pressure trace. Temperature tends to decrease and moisture content to increase in the immediate vicinity of a tornado.

== Life cycle ==
A timelapse of the life cycle of a tornado near Prospect Valley, Colorado

=== Supercell relationship ===
Tornadoes often develop from a class of thunderstorms known as supercells. Supercells contain mesocyclones, an area of organized rotation a few kilometers/miles up in the atmosphere, usually 1.6–9.7 km (1–6 miles) across. Most intense tornadoes (EF3 to EF5 on the Enhanced Fujita Scale) develop from supercells. In addition to tornadoes, very heavy rain, frequent lightning, strong wind gusts, and hail are common in such storms.

Most tornadoes from supercells follow a recognizable life cycle which begins when increasing rainfall drags with it an area of quickly descending air known as the rear flank downdraft (RFD). This downdraft accelerates as it approaches the ground, and drags the supercell's rotating mesocyclone towards the ground with it.

=== Formation ===
As the mesocyclone lowers below the cloud base, it begins to take in cool, moist air from the downdraft region of the storm. The convergence of warm air in the updraft and cool air causes a rotating wall cloud to form. The RFD also focuses the mesocyclone's base, causing it to draw air from a smaller and smaller area on the ground. As the updraft intensifies, it creates an area of low pressure at the surface. This pulls the focused mesocyclone down, in the form of a visible condensation funnel.

As the funnel descends, the RFD also reaches the ground, fanning outward and creating a gust front that can cause severe damage at a considerable distance from the tornado. Usually, the funnel cloud begins causing damage on the ground (becoming a tornado) within a few minutes of the RFD reaching the ground. Many other aspects of tornado formation (such as why some storms form tornadoes while others do not, or what precise role downdrafts, temperature, and moisture play in tornado formation) are still poorly understood.

=== Maturity ===
Initially, the tornado has a good source of warm, moist air flowing inward to power it, and it grows until it reaches the "mature stage". This can last from a few minutes to more than an hour, and during that time a tornado often causes the most damage, and in rare cases can be more than 1.6 km (1 mile) across. The low pressured atmosphere at the base of the tornado is essential to the endurance of the system. Meanwhile, the RFD, now an area of cool surface winds, begins to wrap around the tornado, cutting off the inflow of warm air which previously fed the tornado.

The flow inside the funnel of the tornado is downward, supplying water vapor from the cloud above. This is contrary to the upward flow inside hurricanes, supplying water vapor from the warm ocean below. Therefore, the energy of the tornado is supplied from the cloud above.

=== Dissipation ===
As the RFD completely wraps around and chokes off the tornado's air supply, the vortex begins to weaken, becoming thin and rope-like. This is the "dissipating stage", often lasting no more than a few minutes, after which the tornado ends. During this stage, the shape of the tornado becomes highly influenced by the winds of the parent storm, and can be blown into fantastic patterns. Even though the tornado is dissipating, it is still capable of causing damage. The storm is contracting into a rope-like tube and, due to conservation of angular momentum, winds can increase at this point.

As the tornado enters the dissipating stage, its associated mesocyclone often weakens as well, as the rear flank downdraft cuts off the inflow powering it. Sometimes, in intense supercells, tornadoes can develop cyclically. As the first mesocyclone and associated tornado dissipate, the storm's inflow may be concentrated into a new area closer to the center of the storm and possibly feed a new mesocyclone. If a new mesocyclone develops, the cycle may start again, producing one or more new tornadoes. Occasionally, the old (occluded) mesocyclone and the new mesocyclone produce a tornado at the same time.

Although this is a widely accepted theory for how most tornadoes form, live, and die, it does not explain the formation of smaller tornadoes, such as landspouts, long-lived tornadoes, or tornadoes with multiple vortices. These each have different mechanisms which influence their development—however, most tornadoes follow a pattern similar to this one.

== Types ==
=== Multiple vortex ===
A multiple-vortex tornado is a type of tornado in which two or more columns of spinning air rotate about their own axes and at the same time revolve around a common center. A multi-vortex structure can occur in almost any circulation, but is very often observed in intense tornadoes. These vortices often create small areas of heavier damage along the main tornado path. This is a phenomenon that is distinct from a satellite tornado, which is a smaller tornado that forms very near a large, strong tornado contained within the same mesocyclone. The satellite tornado may appear to "orbit" the larger tornado (hence the name), giving the appearance of one, large multi-vortex tornado. However, a satellite tornado is a distinct circulation, and is much smaller than the main funnel.

=== Waterspout ===
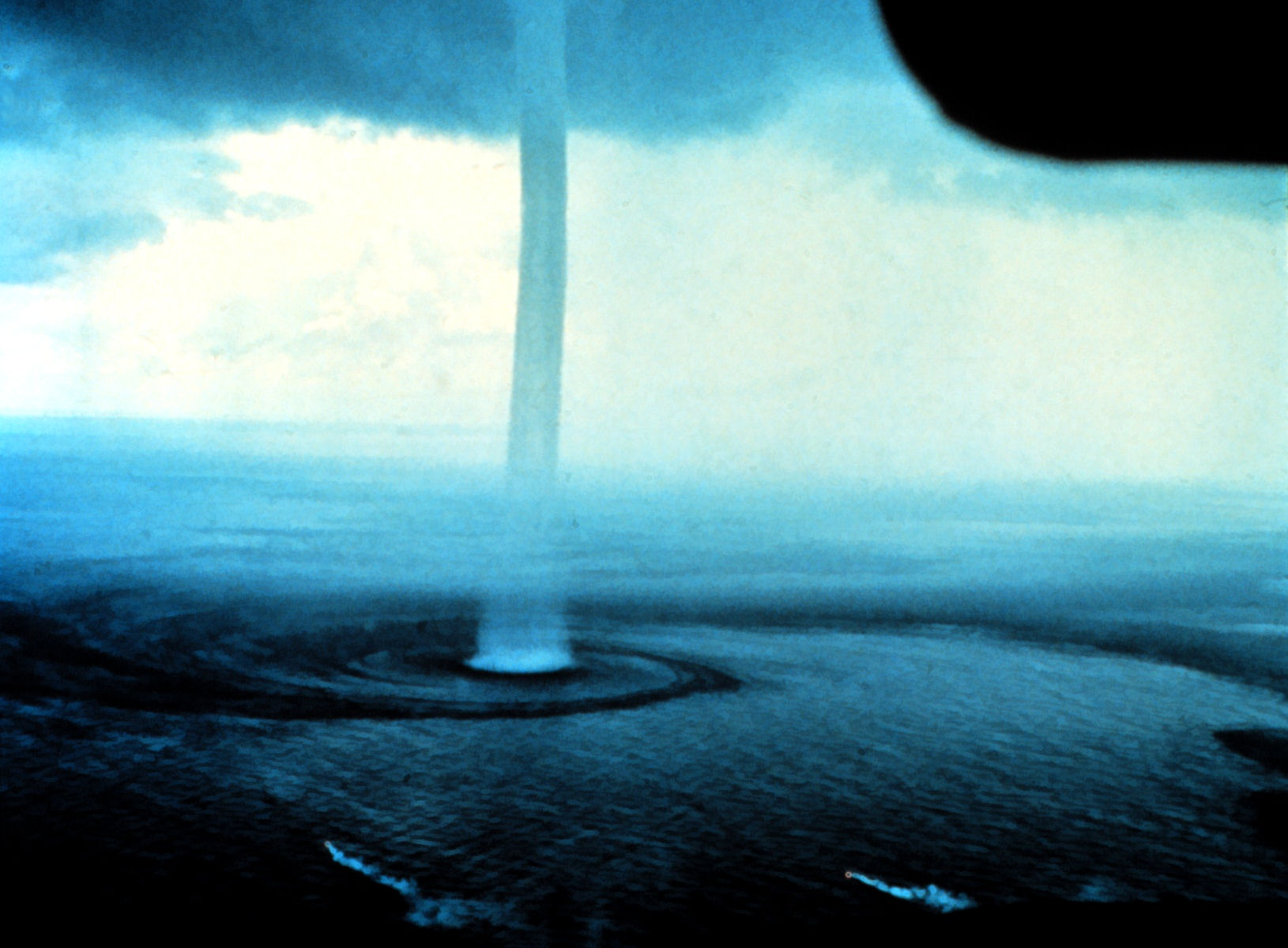
A waterspout near the Florida Keys in 1969.

A waterspout is defined by the National Weather Service as a tornado over water. However, researchers typically distinguish "fair weather" waterspouts from tornadic (i.e. associated with a mesocyclone) waterspouts. Fair weather waterspouts are less severe but far more common, and are similar to dust devils and landspouts. They form at the bases of cumulus congestus clouds over tropical and subtropical waters. They have relatively weak winds, smooth laminar walls, and typically travel very slowly. They occur most commonly in the Florida Keys and in the northern Adriatic Sea. In contrast, tornadic waterspouts are stronger tornadoes over water. They form over water similarly to mesocyclonic tornadoes, or are stronger tornadoes which cross over water. Since they form from severe thunderstorms and can be far more intense, faster, and longer-lived than fair weather waterspouts, they are more dangerous. In official tornado statistics, waterspouts are generally not counted unless they affect land, though some European weather agencies count waterspouts and tornadoes together.

=== Landspout ===
A landspout, or dust-tube tornado, is a tornado not associated with a mesocyclone. The name stems from their characterization as a "fair weather waterspout on land". Waterspouts and landspouts share many defining characteristics, including relative weakness, short lifespan, and a small, smooth condensation funnel that often does not reach the surface. Landspouts also create a distinctively laminar cloud of dust when they make contact with the ground, due to their differing mechanics from true mesoform tornadoes. Though usually weaker than classic tornadoes, they can produce strong winds which could cause serious damage.

=== Similar circulations ===
==== Gustnado ====
A gustnado, or gust front tornado, is a small, vertical swirl associated with a gust front or downburst. Because they are not connected with a cloud base, there is some debate as to whether or not gustnadoes are tornadoes. They are formed when fast-moving cold, dry outflow air from a thunderstorm is blown through a mass of stationary, warm, moist air near the outflow boundary, resulting in a "rolling" effect (often exemplified through a roll cloud). If low level wind shear is strong enough, the rotation can be turned vertically or diagonally and make contact with the ground. The result is a gustnado. They usually cause small areas of heavier rotational wind damage among areas of straight-line wind damage.

==== Dust devil ====
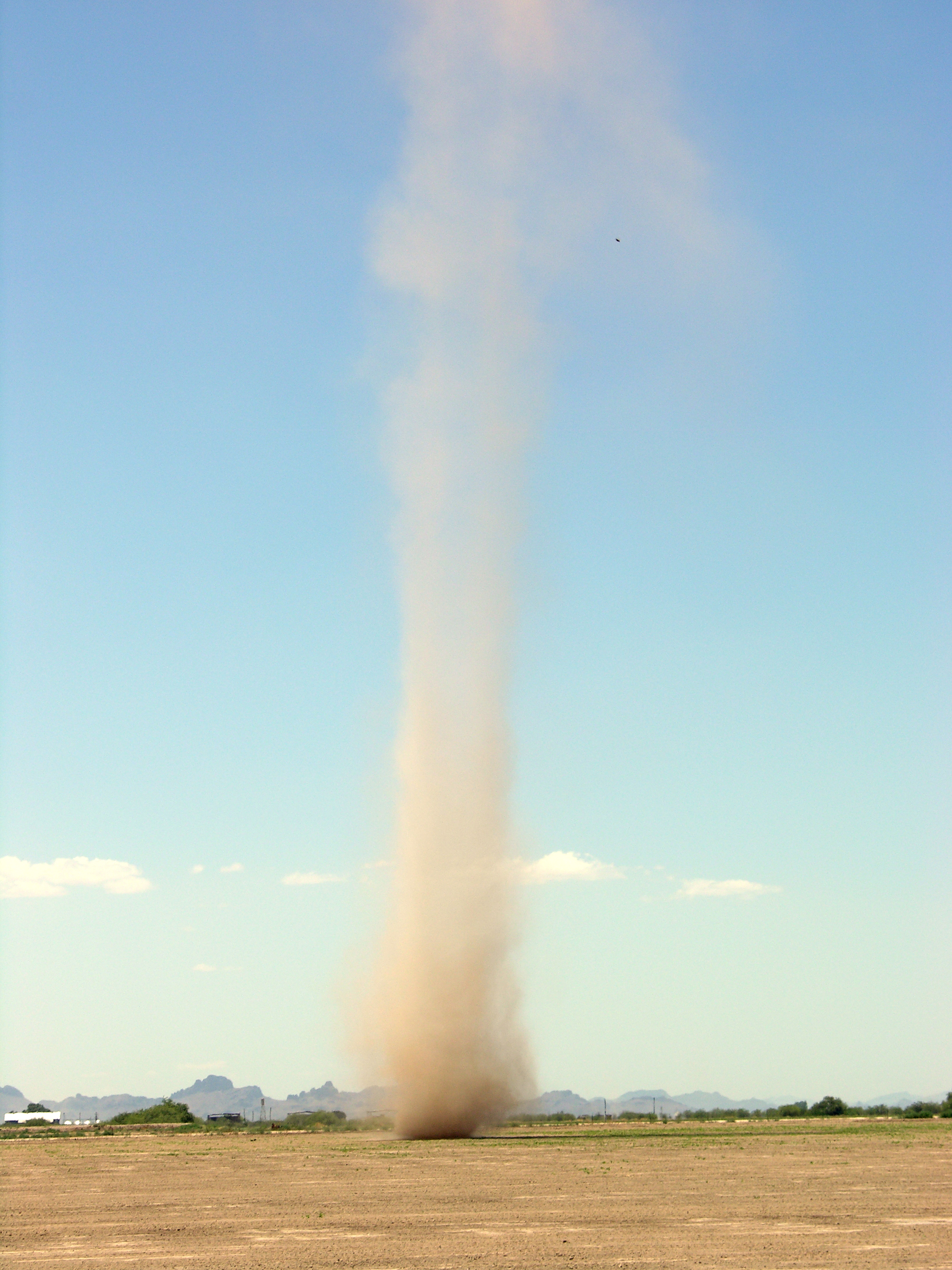
A dust devil in Arizona

A dust devil (also known as a whirlwind) resembles a tornado in that it is a vertical swirling column of air. However, they form under clear skies and are no stronger than the weakest tornadoes. They form when a strong convective updraft is formed near the ground on a hot day. If there is enough low-level wind shear, the column of hot, rising air can develop a small cyclonic motion that can be seen near the ground. They are not considered tornadoes because they form during fair weather and are not associated with any clouds. However, they can, on occasion, result in major damage.

==== Fire whirls ====
Small-scale, tornado-like circulations can occur near any intense surface heat source. Those that occur near intense wildfires are called fire whirls. They are not considered tornadoes, except in the rare case where they connect to a pyrocumulus or other cumuliform cloud above. Fire whirls usually are not as strong as tornadoes associated with thunderstorms. They can, however, produce significant damage.

==== Steam devils ====
A steam devil is a rotating updraft between 50 and 200 metres (160 and 660 ft) wide that involves steam or smoke. These formations do not involve high wind speeds, only completing a few rotations per minute. Steam devils are very rare. They most often form from smoke issuing from a power plant's smokestack. Hot springs and deserts may also be suitable locations for a tighter, faster-rotating steam devil to form. The phenomenon can occur over water, when cold arctic air passes over relatively warm water.

== Intensity and damage ==
Tornado rating classifications
F0 EF0	F1 EF1	F2 EF2	F3 EF3	F4 EF4	F5 EF5
Weak		Strong		Violent	
		Significant			
			Intense		

The Fujita scale, Enhanced Fujita scale (EF), and International Fujita scale rate tornadoes by damage caused. The EF scale was an update to the older Fujita scale, by expert elicitation, using engineered wind estimates and better damage descriptions. The EF scale was designed so that a tornado rated on the Fujita scale would receive the same numerical rating, and was implemented starting in the United States in 2007. An EF0 tornado will probably damage trees but not substantial structures, whereas an EF5 tornado can rip buildings off their foundations leaving them bare and even deform large skyscrapers. The similar TORRO scale ranges from a T0 for extremely weak tornadoes to T11 for the most powerful known tornadoes. Doppler weather radar data, photogrammetry, and ground swirl patterns (cycloidal marks) may also be analyzed to determine intensity and award a rating.

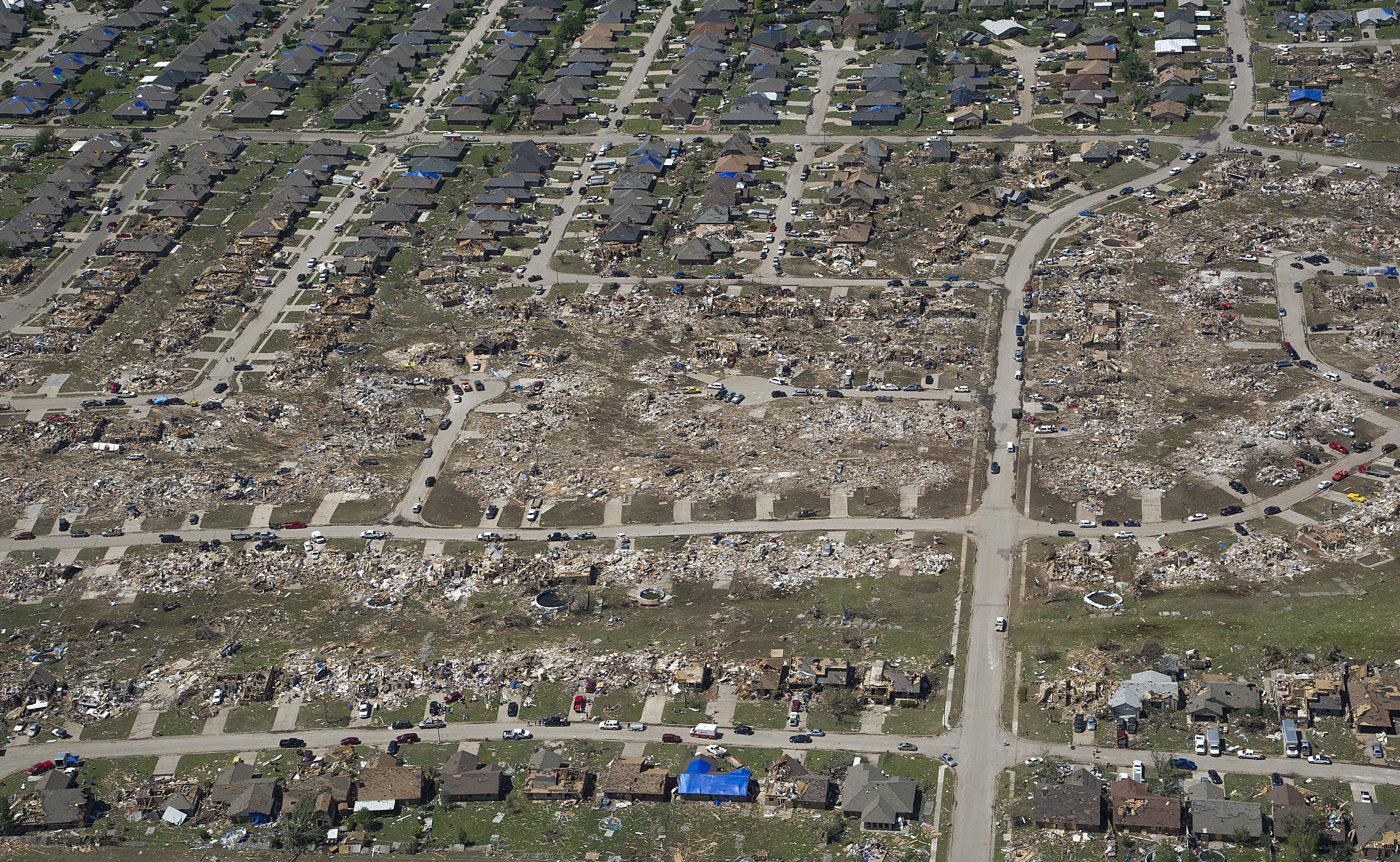
On May 20, 2013, a large tornado of the highest category, EF5, ravaged Moore, Oklahoma.

Tornadoes vary in intensity regardless of shape, size, and location, though strong tornadoes are typically larger than weak tornadoes. The association with track length and duration also varies, although longer track tornadoes tend to be stronger. In the case of violent tornadoes, only a small portion of the path is of violent intensity, most of the higher intensity from subvortices.

In the United States, 80% of tornadoes are EF0 and EF1 (T0 through T3) tornadoes. The rate of occurrence drops off quickly with increasing strength—less than 1% are violent tornadoes (EF4, T8 or stronger). Current records may significantly underestimate the frequency of strong (EF2-EF3) and violent (EF4-EF5) tornadoes, as damage-based intensity estimates are limited to structures and vegetation that a tornado impacts. A tornado may be much stronger than its damage-based rating indicates if its strongest winds occur away from suitable damage indicators, such as in an open field. Outside Tornado Alley, and North America in general, violent tornadoes are extremely rare. This is likely attributable to the lesser number of tornadoes overall, as research shows that tornado intensity distributions are fairly similar worldwide. A few significant tornadoes occur annually in Europe, Asia, southern Africa, and southeastern South America.

== Climatology ==
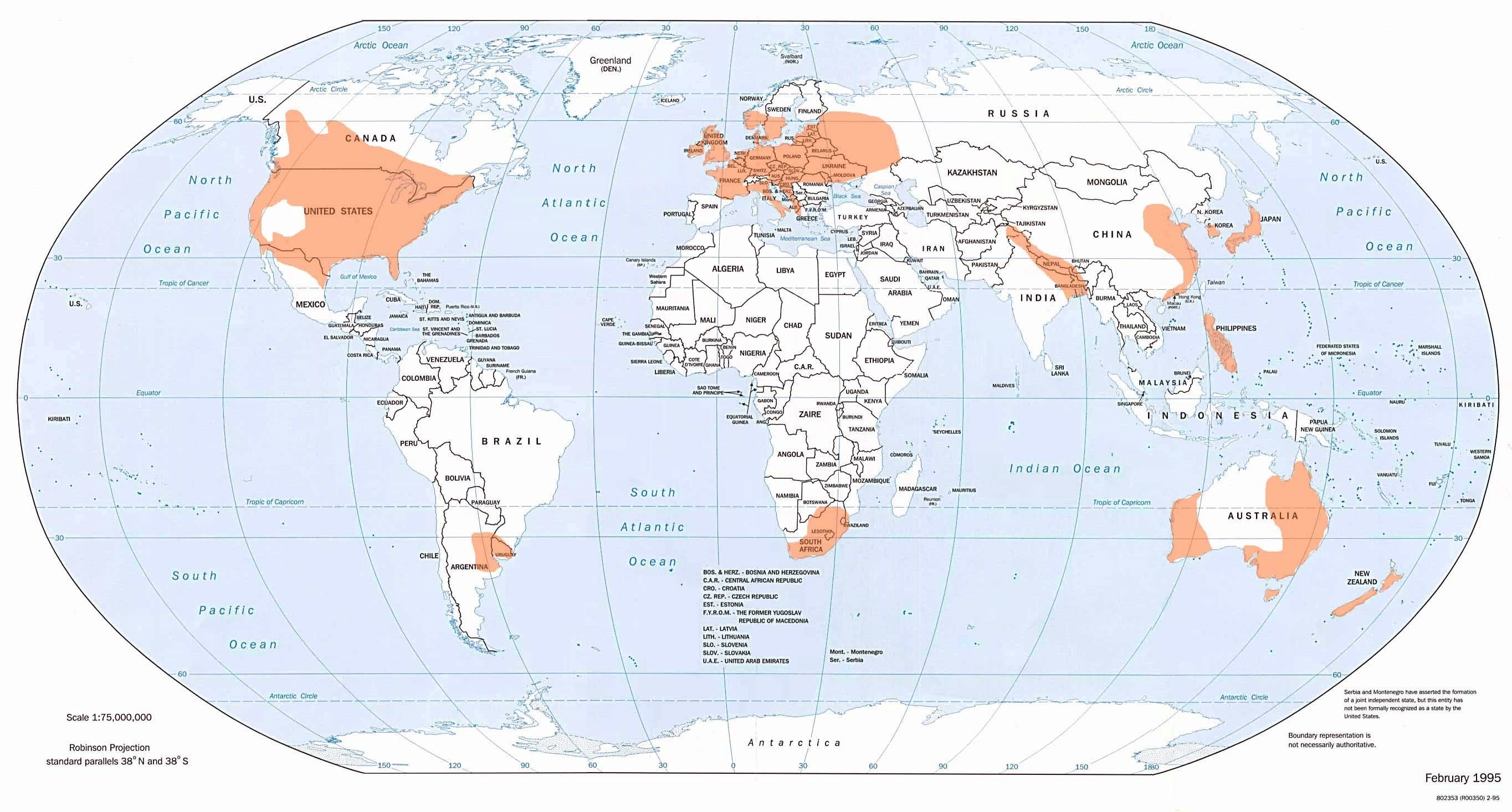
Areas worldwide where tornadoes are most likely, indicated by orange shading

The United States has the most tornadoes out of any country, nearly four times more than estimated in all of Europe, excluding waterspouts. This is mostly due to the unique geography of the continent. North America is a large continent that extends from the tropics north into arctic areas, and has no major east–west mountain range to block air flow between these two areas. In the middle latitudes, where most tornadoes of the world occur, the Rocky Mountains block moisture and buckle the atmospheric flow, forcing drier air at mid-levels of the troposphere due to downsloped winds, and causing the formation of a low pressure area downwind to the east of the mountains. Increased westerly flow off the Rockies force the formation of a dry line when the flow aloft is strong, while the Gulf of Mexico fuels abundant low-level moisture in the southerly flow to its east. This unique topography allows for frequent collisions of warm and cold air, the conditions that breed strong, long-lived storms throughout the year.

A large portion of these tornadoes form in an area of the central United States known as Tornado Alley. This area extends into Canada, particularly Ontario and the Prairie Provinces, although southeast Quebec, the interior of British Columbia, and western New Brunswick are also tornado-prone. Tornadoes also occur across northeastern Mexico.

The United States averages about 1,200 tornadoes per year, followed by Canada, averaging 62 reported per year. NOAA's has a higher average 100 per year in Canada. The Netherlands has the highest average number of recorded tornadoes per area of any country (more than 20, or 0.00048/km^{2}, 0.0012/sq mi annually), followed by the UK (around 33, 0.00013/km^{2}, 0.00034/sq mi per year), although those are of lower intensity, briefer and cause minor damage.

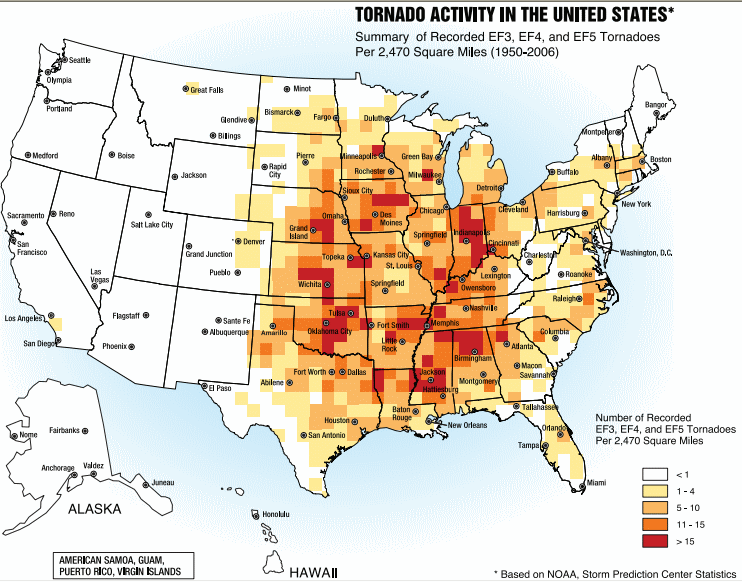
Intense tornado activity in the United States. The darker-colored areas denote the area commonly referred to as Tornado Alley.

Tornadoes kill an average of 179 people per year in Bangladesh, the highest number in the world. Reasons for this include the region's high population density, poor construction quality, and lack of tornado safety knowledge. Other areas of the world that have frequent tornadoes include South Africa, the La Plata Basin area, portions of Europe, Australia and New Zealand, and far eastern Asia.

Tornadoes are most common in spring and least common in winter, but tornadoes can occur any time of year that favorable conditions occur. Spring and fall experience peaks of activity as those are the seasons when stronger winds, wind shear, and atmospheric instability are present. Tornadoes are focused in the right front quadrant of landfalling tropical cyclones, which tend to occur in the late summer and autumn. Tornadoes can also be spawned as a result of eyewall mesovortices, which persist until landfall. Tornados can even form during snow squalls events with no rain present.

Tornado occurrence is highly dependent on the time of day, because of solar heating. Worldwide, most tornadoes occur in the late afternoon, between 15:00 (3 pm) and 19:00 (7 pm) local time, with a peak near 17:00 (5 pm). Destructive tornadoes can occur at any time of day. The Gainesville Tornado of 1936, one of the deadliest tornadoes in history, occurred at 8:30 am local time.

Of all countries, the United Kingdom has the highest incidence of tornadoes per unit area of land. These tornadoes form at all times of the year due to the frequency of unsettled conditions and movement of weather fronts. The United Kingdom has at least 34 tornadoes per year and possibly as many as 50. Most tornadoes in the United Kingdom are weak, but they are occasionally destructive. For example, the Birmingham tornado of 2005 and the London tornado of 2006 both registered F2 on the Fujita scale and both caused significant damage and injury.

=== Associations with climate and climate change ===
U. S. annual count of confirmed tornadoes. The count uptick in 1990 is coincident with the introduction of doppler weather radar.

Associations with various climate and environmental trends exist. For example, an increase in the sea surface temperature of a source region (e.g. Gulf of Mexico and Mediterranean Sea) increases atmospheric moisture content. Increased moisture can fuel an increase in severe weather and tornado activity, particularly in the cool season.

Some evidence does suggest that the Southern Oscillation is weakly correlated with changes in tornado activity, which vary by season and region, as well as whether the ENSO phase is that of El Niño or La Niña. Research has found that fewer tornadoes and hailstorms occur in winter and spring in the U.S. central and southern plains during El Niño, and more occur during La Niña, than in years when temperatures in the Pacific are relatively stable. Ocean conditions could be used to forecast extreme spring storm events several months in advance.

Climatic shifts may affect tornadoes via teleconnections in shifting the jet stream and the larger weather patterns. The climate-tornado link is confounded by the forces affecting larger patterns and by the local, nuanced nature of tornadoes. Although it is reasonable to suspect that global warming may affect trends in tornado activity, any such effect is not yet identifiable due to the complexity, local nature of the storms, and database quality issues. Any effect would vary by region.

== Detection ==
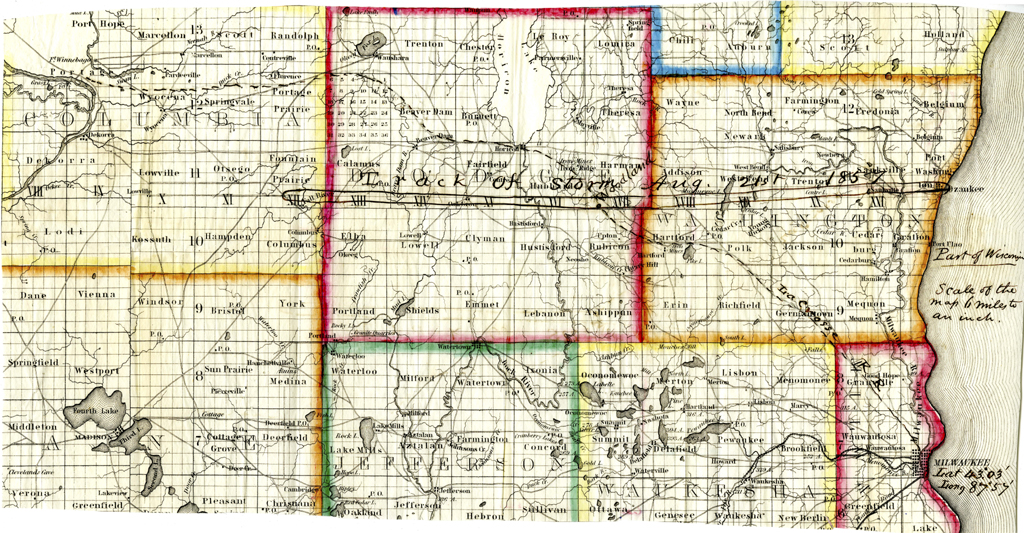
Path of a tornado across Wisconsin on August 21, 1857

Rigorous attempts to warn of tornadoes began in the United States in the mid-20th century. Before the 1950s, the only method of detecting a tornado was by someone seeing it on the ground. Often, news of a tornado would reach a local weather office after the storm. However, with the advent of weather radar, areas near a local office could get advance warning of severe weather. The first public tornado warnings were issued in 1950 and the first tornado watches and convective outlooks came about in 1952. In 1953, it was confirmed that hook echoes were associated with tornadoes. By recognizing these radar signatures, meteorologists could detect thunderstorms probably producing tornadoes from several miles away.

=== Radar ===
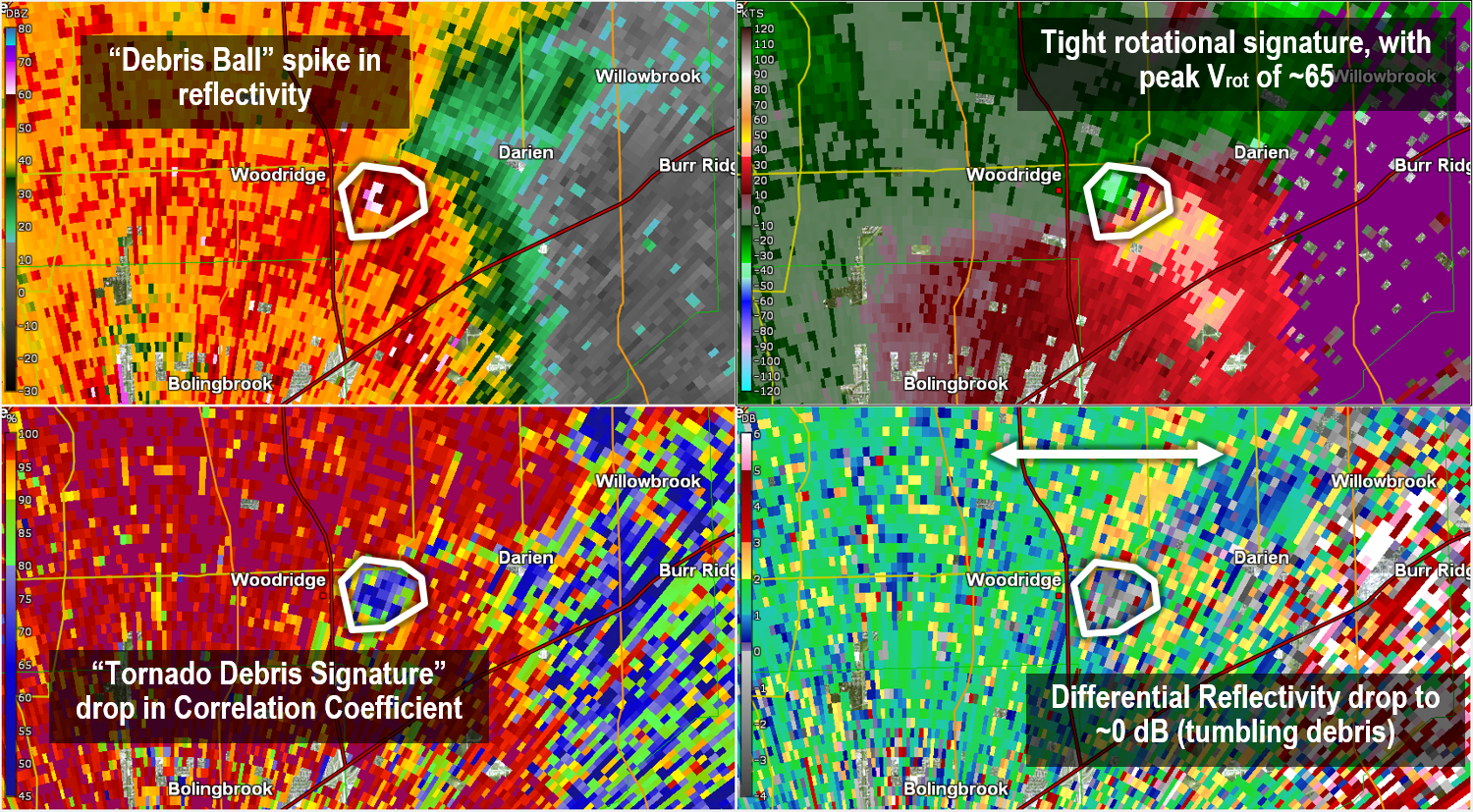
A 2021 EF3 tornado in Illinois is displayed across various NEXRAD data types. Dual-polarization and Doppler velocity products have greatly improved forecasters' ability to detect tornadoes while they are ongoing or imminent when no visual confirmation is available.

Today most developed countries have a network of weather radars, which serves as the primary method of detecting hook signatures that are likely associated with tornadoes. In the United States and a few other countries, Doppler weather radar stations are used. These devices measure the velocity and radial direction (towards or away from the radar) of the winds within a storm, and so can spot evidence of rotation in storms from over 160 km (100 miles) away. When storms are distant from a radar, only areas high within the storm are observed and the important areas below are not sampled. Data resolution also decreases with distance from the radar. Some meteorological situations leading to tornadogenesis are not readily detectable by radar and tornado development may occasionally take place more quickly than radar can complete a scan and send the batch of data. Doppler weather radar systems can detect mesocyclones within a supercell thunderstorm, which allows meteorologists to predict tornado formations within thunderstorms.

=== Storm spotting ===
In the United States, spotters are usually trained by the NWS on behalf of their respective organizations, and report to them. The organizations activate public warning systems such as sirens and the Emergency Alert System (EAS), and they forward the report to the NWS. There are more than 230,000 trained Skywarn weather spotters across the United States.

In Canada, a similar network of volunteer weather watchers, called Canwarn, helps spot severe weather, with more than 1,000 volunteers. In Europe, several nations are organizing spotter networks under the auspices of Skywarn Europe and the Tornado and Storm Research Organisation (TORRO) has maintained a network of spotters in the United Kingdom since 1974.

Storm spotters are required because radar systems such as NEXRAD detect signatures that suggest the presence of tornadoes, rather than tornadoes as such. Radar may give a warning before there is any visual evidence of a tornado or an imminent one, but ground truth from an observer can give definitive information. The spotter's ability to see what radar cannot is especially important as distance from the radar site increases, because the radar beam becomes progressively higher in altitude further away from the radar, chiefly due to curvature of Earth, and the beam also spreads out.

=== Visual evidence ===
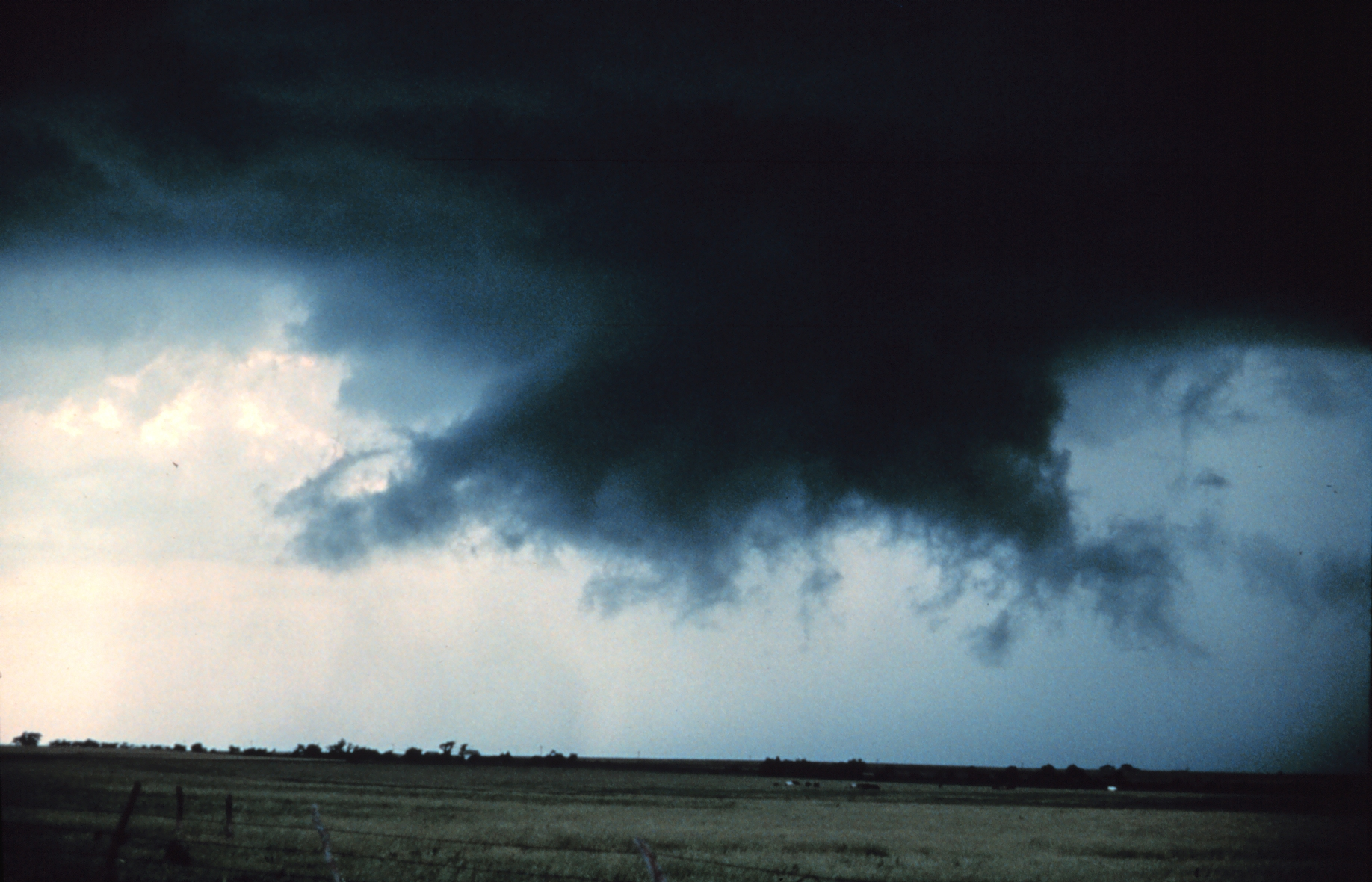
A rotating wall cloud with rear flank downdraft clear slot evident to its left rear

Storm spotters seek to determine whether a storm seen at a distance is a supercell. They typically look to its rear, the main region of updraft and inflow. Under that updraft is a rain-free base, and the next step of tornadogenesis is the formation of a rotating wall cloud. The vast majority of intense tornadoes occur with a wall cloud on the backside of a supercell.

Evidence of a supercell is based on the storm's shape and structure, and cloud tower features such as a hard and vigorous updraft tower, a persistent, large overshooting top, a hard anvil (especially when backsheared against strong upper level winds), and a corkscrew look or striations. Under the storm and closer to where most tornadoes are found, evidence of a supercell and the likelihood of a tornado includes inflow bands (particularly when curved) such as a "beaver tail", and other clues such as strength of inflow, warmth and moistness of inflow air, how outflow- or inflow-dominant a storm appears, and how far is the front flank precipitation core from the wall cloud. Tornadogenesis is most likely at the interface of the updraft and rear flank downdraft, and requires a balance between the outflow and inflow.

Only wall clouds that rotate spawn tornadoes, and they usually precede the tornado between five and thirty minutes. Rotating wall clouds may be a visual manifestation of a low-level mesocyclone. Barring a low-level boundary, tornadogenesis is highly unlikely unless a rear flank downdraft occurs, which is usually visibly evidenced by evaporation of cloud adjacent to a corner of a wall cloud. A tornado often occurs as this happens or shortly afterwards. First, a funnel cloud dips which in nearly all cases develops a surface swirl by the time it reaches halfway down to the ground, signifying that a tornado is on the ground before condensation connects the surface circulation to the storm. Tornadoes may also develop without wall clouds, under flanking lines and on the leading edge. Spotters watch all areas of a storm, and the cloud base and surface.

== Extremes ==
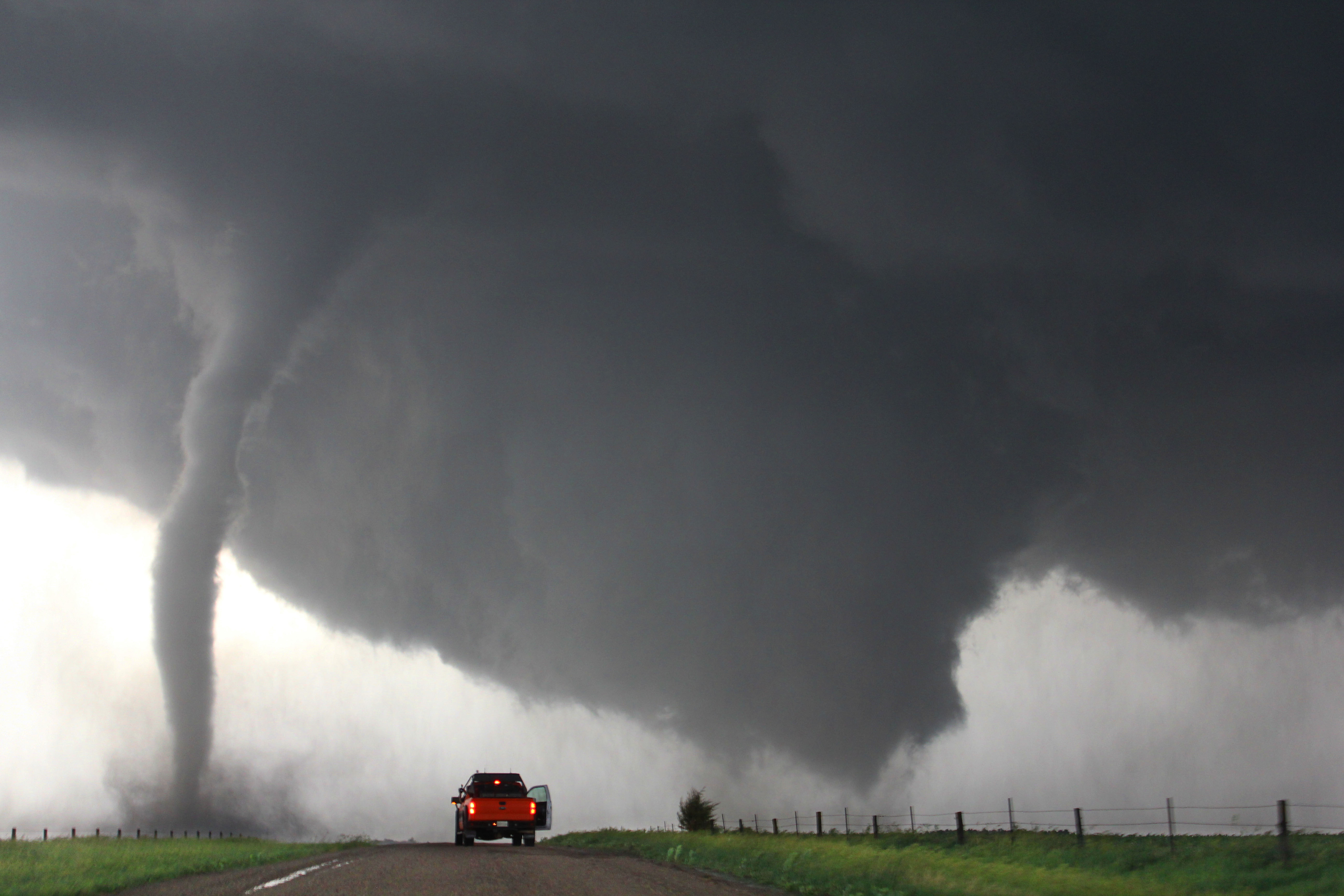
Twin EF4 tornadoes near Pilger, Nebraska in 2014

The Tri-State Tornado, which occurred on March 18, 1925, and affected parts of Missouri, Illinois, and Indiana, holds several tornado records. It was likely an F5 on the Fujita Scale, although this tornado pre-dates the use of scales for rating tornado intensity. It holds the record for the longest path length at 352 kilometres (219 mi), and the longest duration at approximately 3 1/2 hours. As of 2026, it is considered to be the deadliest single tornado in United States history (695 dead). In 2000, it was estimated to be the third costliest tornado when adjusted for inflation.

As of 2025, the deadliest tornado in world history was the Daultipur-Salturia Tornado in Bangladesh on April 26, 1989, which killed approximately 1,300 people. Bangladesh has had at least 24 tornadoes in its history that killed more than 100 people, almost half of the total for the rest of the world.

One of the most extensive tornado outbreaks on record was the 1974 Super Outbreak, which affected a large area of the central United States and extreme southern Ontario on April 3 and 4, 1974. The outbreak featured 148 tornadoes in 18 hours, many of which were violent: seven of F5 intensity, and twenty-three peaking at F4 intensity. Sixteen tornadoes were on the ground at the same time during its peak. More than 300 people, possibly as many as 330, were killed.

Direct measurement of the windspeeds of the most violent tornadoes is nearly impossible because conventional anemometers cannot withstand the intense winds and flying debris. Some tornadoes have been scanned by mobile Doppler radar units, which can provide a good estimate of the tornado's wind speed. As of 2025, the record for the fastest wind speed ever logged (using Doppler radar) was produced by the 1999 Bridge Creek-Moore tornado, with an estimated wind speed of 486 ± 32 km/h (302 ± 20 mph).

Storms that produce tornadoes can feature intense updrafts, sometimes exceeding 240 km/h (150 mph). Debris from a tornado can be lofted into the parent storm and carried a very long distance, a phenomenon known as debris fallout. A tornado which affected Great Bend, Kansas, in November 1915, was an extreme case, where a "rain of debris" occurred 80 miles (130 km) from the town, a sack of flour was found 110 miles (180 km) away, and a cancelled check from the Great Bend bank was found in a field outside of Palmyra, Nebraska, 305 miles (491 km) to the northeast. Waterspouts and tornadoes have been advanced as an explanation for instances of raining fish and other animals.

== Safety ==
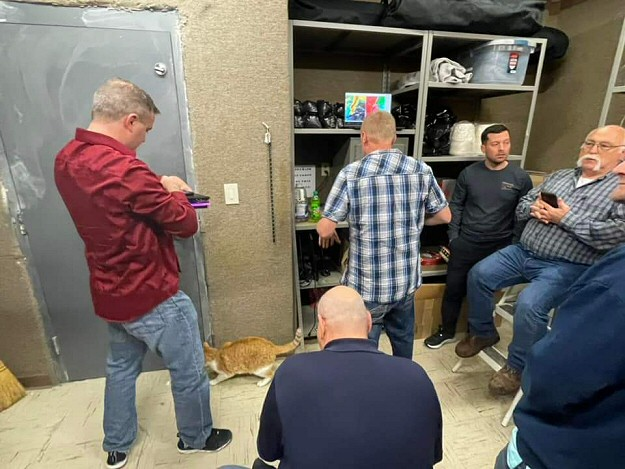
Forecasters sheltering from a tornado in a storage area away from windows

Though tornadoes can strike in an instant, there are precautions and preventative measures that can be taken to increase the chances of survival. Authorities such as the Storm Prediction Center in the United States advise having a pre-determined plan should a tornado warning be issued. When a warning is issued, going to a basement or an interior first-floor room of a sturdy building greatly increases chances of survival. In tornado-prone areas, many buildings have underground storm cellars, which have saved thousands of lives.

Some countries have meteorological agencies which distribute tornado forecasts and increase levels of alert of a possible tornado (such as tornado watches and warnings in the United States and Canada). Weather radios provide an alarm when a severe weather advisory is issued for the local area, mainly available only in the United States. Unless the tornado is far away and highly visible, meteorologists advise that drivers park their vehicles far to the side of the road (so as not to block emergency traffic), and find a sturdy shelter. If no sturdy shelter is nearby, getting low in a ditch is the next best option. Highway overpasses are one of the worst places to take shelter during tornadoes, as the constricted space can be subject to increased wind speed and funneling of debris underneath the overpass.

== Myths and misconceptions ==
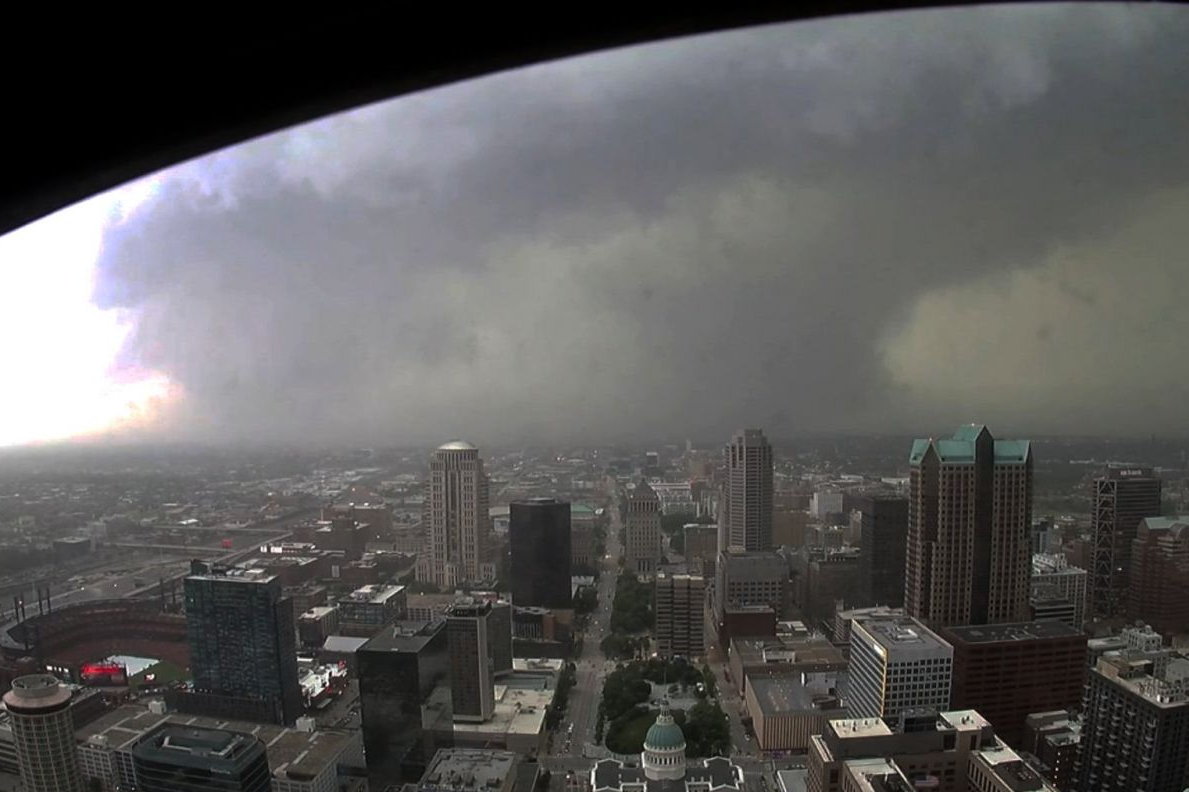
A tornado in St. Louis, Missouri, a large city on a major river, as seen from the Gateway Arch.

Folklore often identifies a green sky with tornadoes, and though the phenomenon may be associated with severe weather, there is no evidence linking it specifically with tornadoes. It is often thought that opening windows will lessen the damage caused by the tornado. While there is a large drop in atmospheric pressure inside a strong tornado, the pressure difference is unlikely to cause significant damage. Opening windows may instead increase the severity of the tornado's damage. A violent tornado can destroy a house whether its windows are open or closed.

Another commonly held misconception is that highway overpasses provide adequate shelter from tornadoes. This belief is partly inspired by widely circulated video captured during the 1991 tornado outbreak near Andover, Kansas, where a news crew and several other people took shelter under an overpass on the Kansas Turnpike and safely rode out a tornado as it passed nearby. However, a highway overpass is a dangerous place during a tornado, and the subjects of the video remained safe due to an unlikely combination of events: the storm in question was a weak tornado, the tornado did not directly strike the overpass, and the overpass itself was of a unique design. Due to the Venturi effect, tornadic winds are accelerated in the confined space of an overpass. Indeed, in the 1999 Oklahoma tornado outbreak of May 3, 1999, three highway overpasses were directly struck by tornadoes, and at each of the three locations there was a fatality, along with many life-threatening injuries. By comparison, during the same tornado outbreak, more than 2,000 homes were completely destroyed and another 7,000 damaged, and yet only a few dozen people died in their homes.

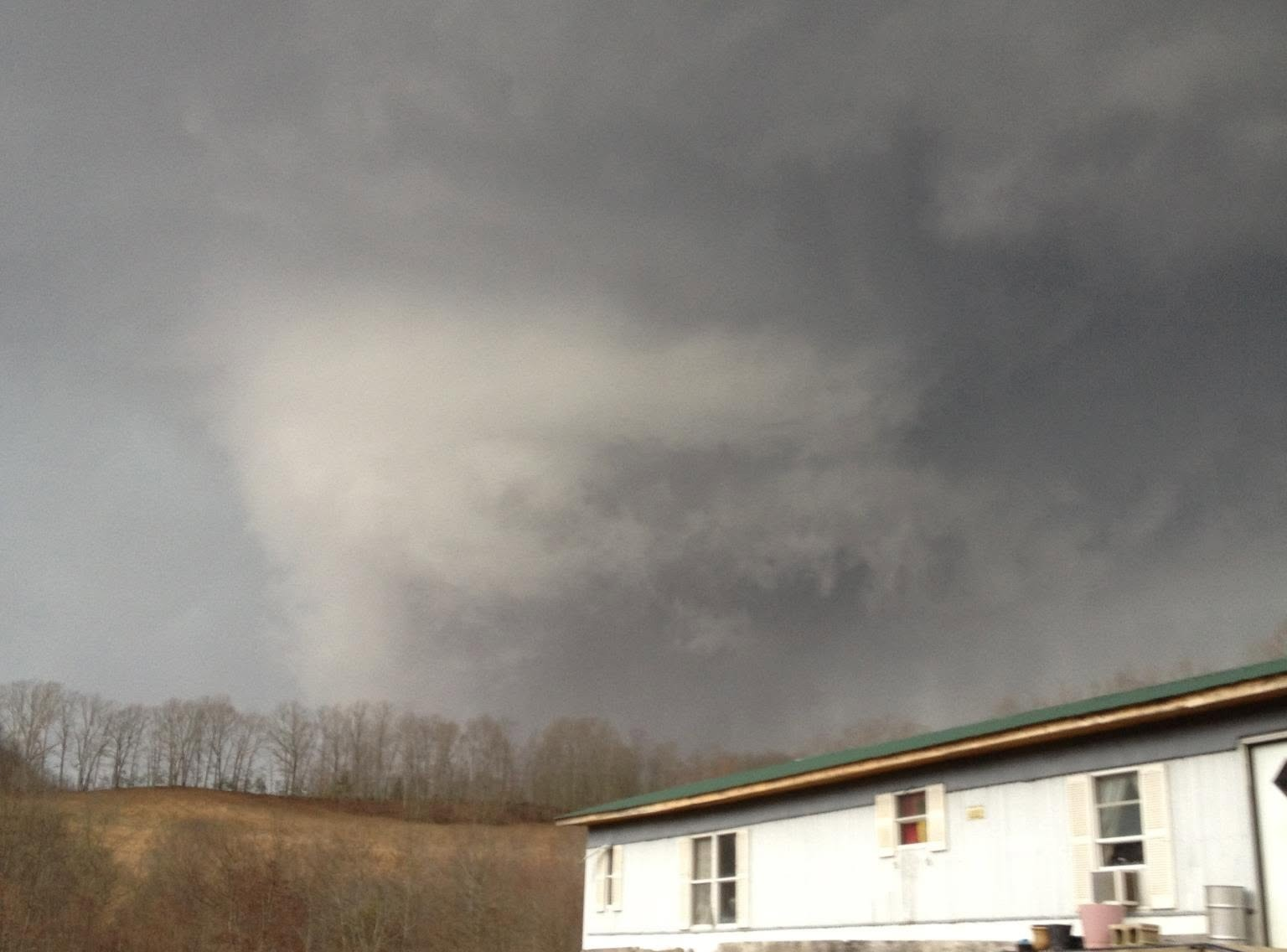
A deadly tornado seen near West Liberty, Kentucky, in the Cumberland Plateau of the Appalachian Mountains.

An old belief is that the southwest corner of a basement provides the most protection during a tornado. The safest place is the side or corner of an underground room opposite the tornado's direction of approach (usually the northeast corner), or the central-most room on the lowest floor. Taking shelter in a basement, under a staircase, or under a sturdy piece of furniture such as a workbench further increases the chances of survival.

There are areas which people believe to be protected from tornadoes, whether by being in a city, near a major river, hill, or mountain. Tornadoes have been known to cross major rivers, climb mountains, affect valleys, and have damaged several city centers. As a general rule, no area is safe from tornadoes, though some areas are more susceptible than others.

== Ongoing research ==
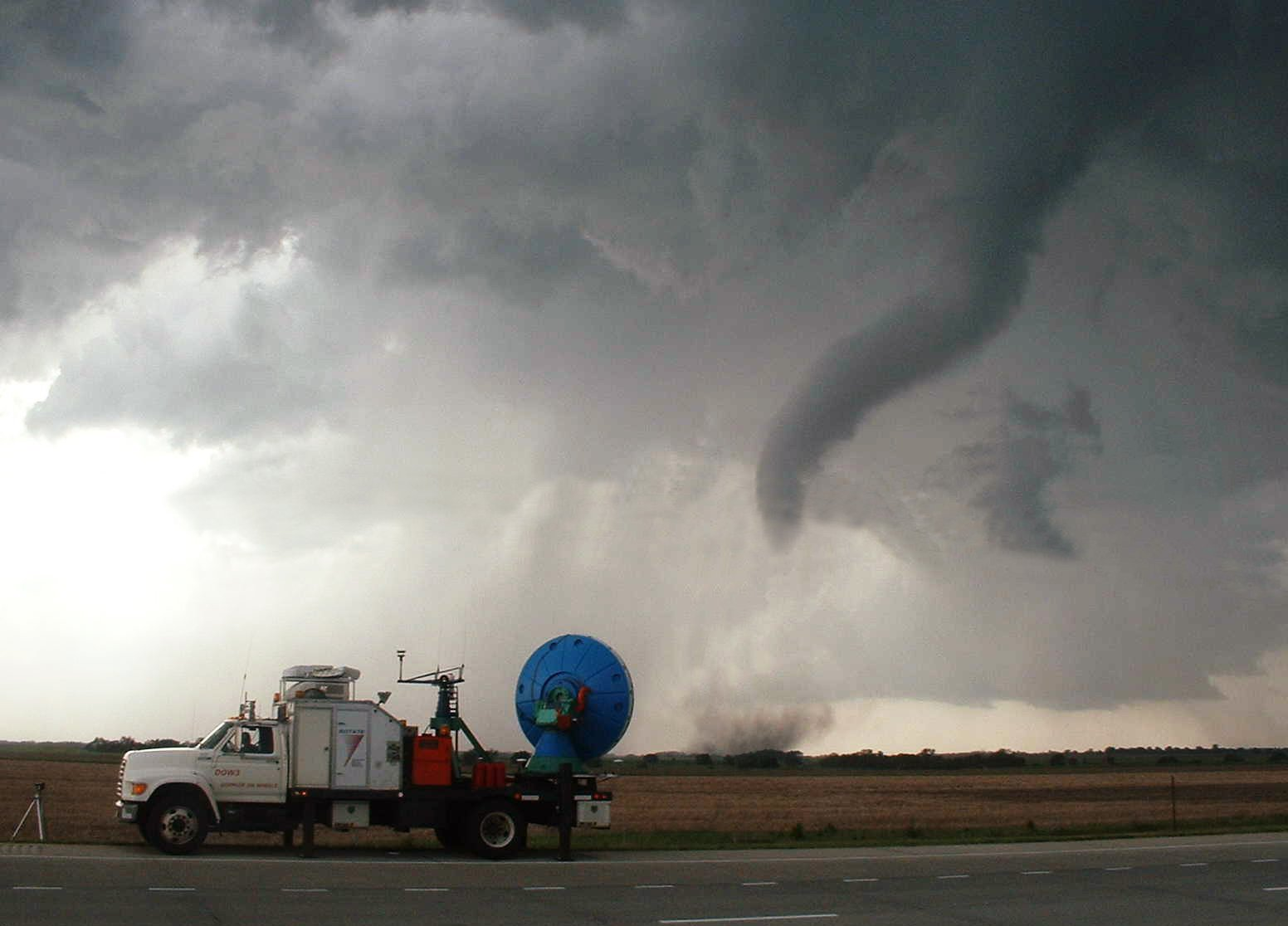
A Doppler on Wheels unit observing a tornado near Attica, Kansas

Meteorology is a relatively young science and the study of tornadoes is newer still. Although researched for about 140 years and intensively so for around 60 years, there are still aspects of tornadoes which remain a mystery. Meteorologists have a fairly good understanding of the development of thunderstorms and mesocyclones, and the meteorological conditions conducive to their formation. However, the step from supercell, or other respective formative processes, to tornadogenesis and the prediction of tornadic vs. non-tornadic mesocyclones is not yet well known and is the focus of much research.

Also under study are the low-level mesocyclone and the stretching of low-level vorticity which tightens into a tornado, in particular, what are the processes and what is the relationship of the environment and the convective storm. Intense tornadoes have been observed forming simultaneously with a mesocyclone aloft (rather than succeeding mesocyclogenesis) and some intense tornadoes have occurred without a mid-level mesocyclone.

In particular, the role of downdrafts, particularly the rear-flank downdraft, and the role of baroclinic boundaries, are intense areas of study.

Reliably predicting tornado intensity and longevity remains a problem, as do details affecting characteristics of a tornado during its life cycle and tornadolysis. Other rich areas of research are tornadoes associated with mesovortices within linear thunderstorm structures and within tropical cyclones.

Meteorologists still do not know the exact mechanisms by which most tornadoes form, and occasional tornadoes still strike without a tornado warning being issued. Analysis of observations including both stationary and mobile (surface and aerial) in-situ and remote sensing (passive and active) instruments generates new ideas and refines existing notions. Numerical modeling also provides new insights as observations and new discoveries are integrated into our physical understanding and then tested in computer simulations which validate new notions as well as produce entirely new theoretical findings, many of which are otherwise unattainable. Importantly, development of new observation technologies and installation of finer spatial and temporal resolution observation networks have aided increased understanding and better predictions.

Research programs, including field projects such as the VORTEX projects (Verification of the Origins of Rotation in Tornadoes Experiment), deployment of TOTO (the TOtable Tornado Observatory), Doppler on Wheels (DOW), and dozens of other programs, hope to solve many questions that still plague meteorologists. Universities, government agencies such as the National Severe Storms Laboratory, private-sector meteorologists, and the National Center for Atmospheric Research are some of the organizations very active in research; with various sources of funding, both private and public, a chief entity being the National Science Foundation. The pace of research is partly constrained by the number of observations that can be taken; gaps in information about the wind, pressure, and moisture content throughout the local atmosphere; and the computing power available for simulation.

Solar storms similar to tornadoes have been recorded, but it is unknown how closely related they are to their terrestrial counterparts.

== See also ==
- Cultural significance of tornadoes
- Cyclone
- Derecho
- List of tornadoes and tornado outbreaks
  - List of F5 and EF5 tornadoes
  - List of F4 and EF4 tornadoes
    - List of F4 and EF4 tornadoes (2020–present)
- Secondary flow
- Skipping tornado
- Space tornado
- Tornado preparedness
- Tornadoes of 2026
- Tropical cyclone
- Typhoon
- Vortex
- Whirlwind
