= CANWARN =

Amateur radio severe weather spotting program

CANWARN, acronym for CANadian Weather Amateur Radio Network, is an organized severe weather spotting and reporting program organized and run by the Meteorological Services of Canada of Environment Canada. What CANWARN members do is called ground truthing they confirm and add information to the remote sensing observations of satellites and radar as well as provide information not observable by these technologies.

The program was first theorized by members of the Windsor Amateur Radio Club in Windsor, Ontario in 1986. Randy Mawson VE3TRW, Paul Robertson VE3HFQ, Jerry Beneteau VE3EXT and Bill Leal VE3ES established the original parameters and processes at that time with the first training session held in Windsor during the winter of 1986/1987 at the Windsor Airport, home at the time of the Windsor Weather Office of Environment Canada. Paul VE3HFQ and Bill VE3ES were literally putting the final touches on the station (VE3YQG) located at the Windsor Weather Office in early April 1987 when the very first CANWARN net was called to order. A report of a tornado in south east Michigan on a path towards Essex County was relayed to Environment Canada's severe weather desk in Toronto, Ontario.

Later that year, after the Edmonton tornado and at the request of the Hage Report CANWARN was expanded beyond the initial program run out of the Windsor (Ontario) Weather Office. Organized storm spotting in Canada had existed prior but operated independently of Environment Canada and never fully achieved the success that the CANWARN program did. Initially, CANWARN was predominantly based in southern Ontario and central Alberta but eventually grew to encompass the entire country by the early 1990s.

The United States began a national storm spotting program in the 1950s. Prior to that, it too had only local spotting programs. In the 1970s, it increased spotting efforts and launched its Skywarn program, which partly inspired CANWARN. In the 2000s, Europe also began organized spotting efforts under the auspices of Skywarn Europe, which consists of autonomous branches in about a dozen countries.

== See also ==
- Amateur Radio Emergency Service
