= Skywarn Europe =

Skywarn Europe is a network of volunteer storm spotters throughout Europe based on the U.S. Skywarn program (a similar program, Canwarn operates in Canada).

Its members attend severe weather training courses and deliver real-time observations of current weather conditions that may be used to warn the public. Its postings may afterwards be entered into databases to evaluate meteorologists' forecasts.

The organization has autonomous branches in Germany, Austria, Switzerland, France, Slovenia, Netherlands, Czech Republic, Slovakia, Poland, and the United Kingdom.

== See also ==
- European Severe Storms Laboratory
- TORRO
