= List of environmental research institutes =

This is a list of environmental research institutes, by country or region. These organizations undertake research on the sustainable management of resources, including water, energy and biodiversity.

== Australia ==
- Arthur Rylah Institute for Environmental Research (ARI)
- Centre for Energy and Environmental Markets (CEEM)
- Cooperative Research Centre
- Environment Institute, University of Adelaide
- Hawkesbury Institute for the Environment (HIE), University of Western Sydney
- Advanced Water Management Centre (AWMC), the University of Queensland
- ANSTO

== Canada ==
- McMaster Institute of Environment and Health (MIEH)
- University of Toronto School of the Environment

== Colombia ==
- International Center for Tropical Agriculture (CIAT) (Centro Internacional de Agricultura Tropical)

== Denmark ==
- Environmental Assessment Institute (EAI)
- Global Biodiversity Information Facility (GBIF) (secretariat)
- Danish Centre for Environment and Energy (DCE)

== Estonia ==
- Estonian Environmental Research Centre (EERC)
  - Estonian Environmental Research Institute (operates within the EERC)

== European Union ==
- European Molecular Biology Laboratory (EMBL)

== Finland ==
- Finnish Environment Institute

== France ==
- Curie Institute (Paris)

== Germany ==
- 0ecologic institute
- Helmholtz Centre for Environmental Research
- Alfred Wegener Institute for Polar and Marine Research
- Institute of Environmental Physics (University of Bremen)
- Institute of Environmental Physics (Heidelberg University)
- Mercator Research Institute on Global Commons and Climate Change
- Öko-Institut
- Wuppertal Institute for Climate, Environment and Energy

== Ghana ==
- Institute for Environment and Sanitation Studies (IESS)

== Greece ==
- Kalamos Island biological field station

== Hong Kong SAR ==
- Research Institute for Sustainable Urban Development (RISUD) at PolyU
- Research Centre for Sustainable Hong Kong (CSHK) at City University

== India ==
- Center for Environmental Nuclear Research (CENR)
- Center for Environmental Planning and Technology (CEPT)
- CEPT Research And Development Foundation (CRDF)
- Indian Agricultural Research Institute (IARI)
- National Environmental Engineering Research Institute (NEERI)
- The Energy and Resources Institute (TERI)
- Centre for Environment Education (CEE)
- Sri Paramakalyani Centre for Environmental Sciences (SPKCES)
- Centre for Science and Environment (CSE)
- Nalanda University Centre - Tribhuvan College
- Centre for Climate Change Research, Indian Institute of Tropical Meteorology, Ministry of Earth Sciences, Government of India (CCCR)

== Iran ==
- International Research Center for Water and Environment (IRCWE)
- Zenderud Environmental Research Center (ZERC)

== Ireland ==
- Environmental Research Institute (ERI)

== Israel ==
- Arava Institute for Environmental Studies (AIES)
- Israel Institute for Biological Research (IBR)

== Italy ==
- Institute of Ecosystem Study (CNR-ISE)

== Japan ==
- Institute of Cetacean Research (ICR)
- Institute for Global Environmental Strategies (IGES)

== Kazakhstan ==
- Sustainable Kazakhstan Research Institute (SKRI)

== Kenya ==
- National Environment Management Authority (NEMA)

== Mexico ==
- El Colegio de la Frontera Sur (ECOSUR)
- Instituto Nacional de Ecología y Cambio Climático (INECC)

== Netherlands ==
- Energy Research Centre of the Netherlands (ECN)
- Netherlands Institute of Ecology (NIOO-KNAW)
- Royal Netherlands Institute for Sea Research (NIOZ)

== Nigeria ==
- Centre for Environmental Research & Training (CERT)
- Institute of Environmental Accountants

== New Zealand ==
- Environmental Research Institute (University of Waikato)
- Centre for Sustainability
- GNS Science (formerly the Institute of Geological and Nuclear Sciences)
- NIWA (National Institute of Water and Atmospheric Research)
- Te Waiora Joint Institute for Freshwater Management (University of Waikato and NIWA)
- Cawthron Institute
- ESR (Institute of Environmental Science and Research)
- Manaaki Whenua Landcare Research

== Norway ==
- Centre for International Climate and Environmental Research
- Norwegian Institute for Nature Research

== Panama ==
- Smithsonian Tropical Research Institute

== Philippines ==
- Environmental and Climate Change Research Institute - ECCRI

== Poland ==
- Curie Institute (Warsaw)

== Portugal ==
- Environmental Health Institute (ISAMB)

== Romania ==
- National R&D Institute for Industrial Ecology - ECOIND

== Russia ==
- Mir Environmental Effects Payload (MEEP)

== Singapore ==
- NUS Environmental Research Institute

== Spain ==
- Institute of Environmental Science and Technology, ICTA UAB

== South Korea ==
- Korea Environment Institute (KEI)
- National Institute of Environmental Research (NIER)

== Sweden ==
- Stockholm Environment Institute
- Stockholm Resilience Centre

== Switzerland ==
- Center for Development and Environment (CDE)
- Centre for International Environmental Studies (CIES)

== Taiwan ==
- Research Center for Climate Change and Sustainable Development
- Research Center for Future Earth (NTU RCFE)
- Centre for Global Change and Sustainability Science Center (CGCSS)

== United Kingdom ==
- Cabot Institute, University of Bristol
- Center for Ecology and Hydrology (CEH)
- Chartered Institute of Environmental Health (CIEH)
- Durrell Institute of Conservation and Ecology
- European Bioinformatics Institute (EBI)
- Grantham Institute - Climate Change and Environment, Imperial College London
- Centre for Environmental Policy (CEP), Imperial College London
- Institute of Sustainability and Climate Change, University of Bath
- Institute of Biological, Environmental and Rural Sciences (IBERS), Wales
- Earthwatch Europe
- Institute of Zoology (IoZ)
- International Institute for Environment and Development (IIED)
- National Institute for Environmental eScience (NIEeS)
- Oxford Environmental Change Institute
- UCL Institute for Sustainable Resources (ISR)
- Tyndall Centre for Climate Change Research

== United States ==
- Botanical Research Institute of Texas (BRIT)
- Center for Environmental Legal Studies (CELS), USA
- Center for Global Change & Earth Observations (CGCEO), USA
- Center for Law, Energy & the Environment at Berkeley Law (CLEE)
- Cary Institute of Ecosystem Studies
- Conard Environmental Research Area (CERA), Iowa
- Cooperative Institute for Arctic Research, Alaska
- Cooperative Institute for Climate and Ocean Research (CICOR)
- Cooperative Institute for Climate Applications and Research (CICAR)
- Cooperative Institute for Climate Science (CICS)
- Cooperative Institute for Great Lakes Research (CIGLR)
- Cooperative Institute for Marine and Atmospheric Studies (CIMAS)
- Cooperative Institute for Mesoscale Meteorological Studies (CIMMS)
- Cooperative Institute for Research in Environmental Sciences (CIRES)
- Cooperative Institute for Research in the Atmosphere (CIRA)
- Cornell Laboratory of Ornithology, New York
- The Earth Institute, Columbia University, New York
- Earth System Research Laboratories (ESRL)
- Earthwatch Institute, Boston, Massachusetts
- Energy and Environmental Research Center (EERC), North Dakota
- Environmental and Energy Study Institute (EESI), Washington, DC
- Florida Environmental Research Institute (FERI)
- Florida Institute of Oceanography (FIO)
- Global Energy Network Institute (GENI), California
- Global Environment Facility (GEF), Washington, DC (secretariat)
- Graham Sustainability Institute, University of Michigan
- Institute at Brown for Environment and Society (IBES), Brown University, Providence, Rhode Island
- Institute of Energy and the Environment (IEE), Penn State University
- Institute on the Environment, University of Minnesota (IonE), St. Paul, Minnesota
- Integrated Taxonomic Information System (ITIS-North America), Washington, DC (secretariat)
- National Severe Storms Laboratory (NSSL)
- National Snow and Ice Data Center (NSIDC)
- Pacific Marine Environmental Laboratory (PMEL)
- Property and Environment Research Center (PERC), Montana
- Smithsonian Environmental Research Center (SERC)
- Southern California Coastal Water Research Project Authority (SCCWRP)
- UC Davis Tahoe Environmental Research Center (TERC)
- UCLA Institute of the Environment and Sustainability, University of California at Los Angeles
- USC Wrigley Institute for Environmental Studies (WIES)
- Yale Center for Environmental Law and Policy

== See also ==
- List of forest research institutes
- Lists of environmental topics
