= CRCP =

CRCP may refer to:

- CRCP (gene)
- Consumer Rights Commission of Pakistan, NGO in Pakistan
- Coral Reef Conservation Program, US NOAA partnership programme
- Cardinal Ritter College Prep High School, school in Missouri, United States
