= National Ocean Service =

U.S. government agency

- National Ocean Survey (1970–1983); National Ocean Service (1983–present)

Agency overview
- Formed: October 9, 1970
- Jurisdiction: Federal government of the United States
- Headquarters: 1305 East-West Highway Silver Spring, Maryland, U.S.; 38°59′30″N 77°01′48″W
- Employees: 1,259 (FY 2012)
- Annual budget: US $559.6 million (FY 2012)
- Agency executive: Nicole LeBoeuf, Assistant Administrator, National Ocean Service
- Parent agency: National Oceanic and Atmospheric Administration
- Website: oceanservice.noaa.gov

The National Ocean Service (NOS) is an office within the U.S. Department of Commerce, National Oceanic and Atmospheric Administration (NOAA). It is responsible for preserving and enhancing the nation's coastal resources and ecosystems along approximately 95,000 miles (153,000 km) of shoreline, that is bordering 3,500,000 square miles (9,100,000 km^{2}) of coastal, Great Lakes, and ocean waters. Its mission is to "provide science-based solutions through collaborative partnerships to address the evolving economic, environmental, and social pressures on our oceans and coasts." Its projects focus on working to ensure safe and efficient marine transportation, promoting the protection of coastal communities, conserving marine and coastal places. NOS employs 1,700 scientists, natural resource managers, and specialists in many different fields. The National Ocean Service was previously also known as the National Ocean Survey until it was renamed in 1983.

== Organization ==
As one of the six NOAA Line Offices, NOAA's National Ocean Service (NOS) observes, studies, and manages the nation's coastal and marine resources. The NOS measures and predicts the coastal and ocean phenomena, protects large areas of the oceans, works to ensure safe navigation, and provides tools and information to protect and restore the coastal and marine resources. NOAA's National Ocean Service is composed of seven programs and two staff offices.

=== Program offices ===
- Center for Operational Oceanographic Products and Services (CO-OPS)
- National Centers for Coastal Ocean Science (NCCOS)
- Office of Coast Survey (OCS)
- Office for Coastal Management (OCM)
- National Geodetic Survey (NGS)
- Office of National Marine Sanctuaries (ONMS)
- Office of Response and Restoration (OR&R)

=== Staff offices ===
- Integrated Ocean Observing System Program (IOOS)
- Management and Budget Office (MBO)

== Center for Operational Oceanographic Products and Services ==
The Center for Operational Oceanographic Products and Services (CO-OPS) is a source for water-level and current measurements that support safe and efficient maritime commerce, sound coastal management, and recreation. CO-OPS is composed of four divisions:

=== Field Operations Division ===
The Field Operations Division (FOD) operates and maintains all oceanographic and Great Lakes observing systems required to meet CO-OPS' mission objectives. The Division monitors the continuous operations of navigation and other real-time observing systems to support the protection of life and property. FOD also operates the Ocean Systems Test and Evaluation Facility (OSTEF) to support Requirements and Development Division (RDD), and Information Systems Division (ISD) development efforts. FOD operates equipment to evaluate new observing systems and software modules developed to support NOS mission objectives. The Division installs, documents, operates and maintains CO-OPS measurement systems (e.g., NWLON, PORTS); conducts field reconnaissance and geodetic operations to include the establishment, leveling, documentation, and inspection of NOS benchmarks; and provides training in the installation, operation and maintenance of CO-OPS observing equipment.

=== Oceanographic Division ===
The Oceanographic Division monitors the quality of all data collected by CO-OPS, and produces operational products from this data stream. The Division monitors the performance of all CO-OPS observing systems and reports discrepancies to appropriate Center personnel. The Division performs operational data quality control/data analysis; produces oceanographic products; manages the content of CO-OPS data/product delivery systems; develops web page services; distributes real-time data to CO-OPS customers; provides information for matters such as litigation and boundary disputes (e.g., certified water level and benchmark information); provides technical assistance to customers regarding the use of CO-OPS products and services; designs new products and services to meet user needs, and maintains customer lists, billing information and accounting procedures to ensure the accurate accounting of revenues collected through user fees.

=== Engineering Division ===
The Engineering Division establishes observation and analysis requirements for CO-OPS based on the assessment of user/customer needs. The Division also manages the Ocean Systems Test and Evaluation Program (OSTEP) and its associated test facilities. The Division develops new oceanographic measurement systems and techniques to improve the safety of marine navigation. The Division: develops and issues standard operating procedures, project instructions, and manuals, to guide the operation and maintenance of CO-OPS oceanographic and meteorological measurement systems; prepares measurement requirements (based on tidal zoning) for hydrographic or photogrammetric field surveys, and to support other NOS needs for water level and current information; prepares and monitors interagency agreements, technology transfer agreements and work plans; prepares and administers contracts; provides technical assistance and guidance to other countries, agencies, and the public in the establishment and operation of water level and current measurement stations; and develops/integrates measurement and telemetry systems needed to support CO-OPS activities.

== National Centers for Coastal Ocean Science ==
The National Centers for Coastal Ocean Science (NCCOS) provides research, scientific information and tools to help balance the nation's ecological, social and economic goals. The research and tools provided are central to addressing coastal issues raised in legislation and NOAA's priorities. NCCOS were formed within the National Ocean Service (NOS) in March 1999 as the focal point for coastal ocean science.

== Office of Coast Survey ==
Provides navigation products and services that ensure safe and efficient maritime commerce on America's oceans and coastal waters, and in the Great Lakes. OCS consists of the following offices:

- Marine Chart Division
- Hydrographic Surveys Division
- Navigation Services Division
- Coast Survey Development Lab

== Office for Coastal Management ==
Established in 2014 when NOAA combined two offices: the Coastal Services Center and the Office of Ocean and Coastal Resource Management. In addition to implementing specific initiatives, a top priority for NOAA's Office for Coastal Management is to unify efforts to make communities more resilient. Many organizations are involved, including the private sector, nonprofits, the scientific community, and all levels of government. The Office for Coastal Management works to be a unifying force in these efforts, providing unbiased NOAA data and tools and providing opportunities for the community to come together to define common goals and find ways to work smarter by working together. Issues include endangered species protection, erosion, and generating better building codes for storm-resistant buildings. The OCM has four programs:

=== Coastal Zone Management ===
The National Coastal Zone Management Program addresses the nation's coastal issues through a voluntary partnership between the federal government and coastal and Great Lakes states and territories. Authorized by the Coastal Zone Management Act of 1972, the program provides the basis for protecting, restoring, and responsibly developing coastal communities and resources. Currently 34 coastal states participate. While state partners must follow basic requirements, the program also gives states the flexibility to design unique programs that best address their coastal challenges and regulations.

=== Coral Reef Conservation Program (CRCP) ===
NOAA's Coral Reef Conservation Program (CRCP) is a program that brings together expertise from a wide array of NOAA programs and offices in the National Ocean Service (NOS), National Marine Fisheries Service (NMFS), Office of Oceanic and Atmospheric Research (OAR), and the National Environmental Satellite, Data, and Information Service (NESDIS). The CRCP was established in 2000 to help fulfill NOAA's responsibilities under the Coral Reef Conservation Act of 2000 (CRCA) and the U.S. Coral Reef Task Force (established by Presidential Executive Order 13089 on Coral Reef Protection). The mission of the CRCP is to protect, conserve, and restore coral reef resources by maintaining healthy ecosystem function. CRCP focuses on four main pillars of work: increase resilience to climate change, reduce land-based sources of pollution, improve fisheries' sustainability, and restore viable coral populations. In strong partnership with local managers, CRCP addresses strategic coral reef management needs in a targeted, cost-effective, and efficient manner.

CRCP funds and equips reef conservation activities by NOAA and its partners in the seven U.S. states and jurisdictions containing coral reefs (American Samoa, the Commonwealth of the Northern Mariana Islands, Florida, Guam, Hawaii, Puerto Rico, and the United States Virgin Islands), uninhabited islands including the Northwestern Hawaiian Islands and Pacific Remote Island Areas, and the Pacific Freely Associated States (Federated States of Micronesia, Republic of the Marshall Islands, and Palau). CRCP supports multiple cross-cutting activities and associated products including the National Coral Reef Monitoring Program and Coral Reef Watch.

=== Digital Coast ===
This NOAA-sponsored website is focused on helping communities address coastal issues and has become one of the most-used resources in the coastal management community.

=== National Estuarine Research Reserves ===
The National Estuarine Research Reserve System is a network of 29 coastal sites designated to protect and study estuarine systems. Established through the Coastal Zone Management Act, the reserves represent a partnership program between NOAA and the coastal states. NOAA provides funding and national guidance, and each site is managed on a daily basis by a lead state agency or university with input from local partners.

== Office of National Geodetic Survey ==
The Office of National Geodetic Survey (NGS) provides the framework for all positioning activities in the nation. The foundational elements - latitude, longitude, elevation, shoreline information and their changes over time - contribute to informed decision making and impact a wide range of important activities including mapping and charting, navigation, flood risk determination, transportation, land use and ecosystem management. NGS' authoritative spatial data, models, and tools are vital for the protection and management of natural and manmade resources and support the economic prosperity and environmental health of the nation. The NGS consists of six divisions:

- Geodetic Services: provides a direct relationship between NGS and its customers through the state advisor program, geodetic equipment testing and evaluation, product evaluation, marketing, distribution, and various training programs.
- Spatial Reference Systems: maintains the Continuously Operating Reference Station (CORS) network and plans, coordinates and provides technical guidance for geodetic field projects and products required to preserve and develop the National Spatial Reference System (NSRS).
- Remote Sensing: involves all aspects of airport charting and shoreline mapping using traditional methods while exploring more efficient technologies to complement current practices.
- Observations & Analysis: conducts geodetic surveys to support the National Spatial Reference System, the production of airport obstruction charts, the location of aeronautical aids to navigation, and the production of coastal maps, charts, and special products in the coastal zone. The Division also conducts field surveys required to support photogrammetric and hydrographic surveys.
- Systems Development: administers the central processing units, disk and storage systems, telecommunications and network systems, and peripheral input and output systems for NGS. The Division also researches, designs, develops, implements, and conveys the operational use of computer-assisted systems for the acquisition, reduction, analyses, display, and transmission of geodetic, photogrammetric, and remote sensing source data.
- Geosciences Research: coordinates the research, development and management of new geodetic data products. The Division also designs and programs scientific and geodetic software applications and procedures.

== Office of National Marine Sanctuaries ==
The Office of National Marine Sanctuaries (ONMS) serves as the trustee for the National Marine Sanctuary system, a network of underwater parks encompassing more than 170,000 square miles (128,000 sq nmi; 440,000 km^{2}) of Great Lakes and oceanic waters. As of October 11, 2024, the network includes a system of 17 national marine sanctuaries:

- Channel Islands National Marine Sanctuary
- Chumash Heritage National Marine Sanctuary
- Cordell Bank National Marine Sanctuary
- Florida Keys National Marine Sanctuary
- Flower Garden Banks National Marine Sanctuary
- Gray's Reef National Marine Sanctuary
- Greater Farallones National Marine Sanctuary
- Hawaiian Islands Humpback Whale National Marine Sanctuary
- Lake Ontario National Marine Sanctuary
- Mallows Bay–Potomac River National Marine Sanctuary
- Monitor National Marine Sanctuary
- Monterey Bay National Marine Sanctuary
- National Marine Sanctuary of American Samoa
- Olympic Coast National Marine Sanctuary
- Stellwagen Bank National Marine Sanctuary
- Thunder Bay National Marine Sanctuary
- Wisconsin Shipwreck Coast National Marine Sanctuary

The ONMS also participates in the administration of two marine national monuments, the Papahānaumokuākea Marine National Monument, which it administers jointly with the United States Fish and Wildlife Service and the State of Hawaii, and the Rose Atoll Marine National Monument, which it administers jointly with the U.S. Fish and Wildlife Service.

== Office of Response and Restoration ==
NOAA's Office of Response and Restoration (OR&R) is a center for preparation and response to threats to coastal environments, including oil and chemical spills, releases from hazardous waste sites, and marine debris. The Office of Response and Restoration's tasks include:

- Provides scientific and technical support to prepare for and respond to oil and chemical releases.
- Determines damage to natural resources from these releases.
- Protects and restores marine and coastal ecosystems, including coral reefs.
- Works with communities to address critical local and regional coastal challenges.

OR&R has three divisions:

=== Emergency Response Division ===
The Emergency Response Division (ERD) of NOAA's Office of Response and Restoration (OR&R) provides scientific expertise to an incident response. Under the National Contingency Plan, NOAA has responsibility for providing scientific support to the Federal On-Scene Coordinator (FOSC) for oil and hazardous material spills. To support this mandate, ERD provides response to spill events at any time of day.

=== Assessment and Restoration Division ===
The Assessment and Restoration Division (ARD), formerly Coastal Protection and Restoration Division (CPRD), is responsible for evaluating and restoring coastal and estuarine habitats damaged by hazardous waste releases, oil spills, and vessel groundings. ARD joined with NOAA's General Counsel for Natural Resources and Office of Habitat Conservation to create the Damage Assessment, Remediation and Restoration Program (DARRP). This NOAA partnership focuses on the protection and restoration of marine natural resources. The Assessment and Restoration Division is composed of NOAA biologists, toxicologists, ecologists, policy analysts, attorneys, geologists, environmental engineers, and economists. It assesses ecological, environmental, and economic risk and injury from contamination and ship groundings. In particular, ARD has developed specific expertise in aquatic risk assessment techniques, contaminated sediment issues, and data interpretation. The ARD publishes the Screening Quick Reference Tables (SQuiRT cards), for rapid evaluation of water, sediment and soil contamination.

=== Marine Debris Division ===
Since 2005, the NOAA Marine Debris Program has been a NOAA program focused on researching, reducing, and preventing debris in the marine environment nationally and globally. The program works with various partners across the U.S. to fulfill its mission.

== Integrated Ocean Observing System ==
The Integrated Ocean Observing System (IOOS) is a national-regional partnership working to understand and predict coastal events - such as storms, wave heights, and sea level change.

== History ==
The National Ocean Service traces its history to 1807, when the Survey of the Coast was created as the U.S. Government's first scientific agency. The agency was renamed the United States Coast Survey in 1836 and the United States Coast and Geodetic Survey in 1878. On October 3, 1970, when the Environmental Science Services Administration (ESSA) was replaced by NOAA, the Coast and Geodetic Survey was merged with other government scientific agencies to form NOAA. The Coast and Geodetic Survey′s organizational existence lingered until October 9, 1970, when its successor agency within NOAA, the National Ocean Survey, took over its assets and responsibilities. Under the National Ocean Survey, the Office of Coast Survey took over the Coast and Geodetic Survey′s hydrographic survey duties and its geodetic responsibilities were transferred to the National Geodetic Survey. The Coast and Geodetic Survey's fleet of survey ships temporarily came under the direct control of the National Ocean Survey, although via a phased process during 1972 and 1973 they merged with ships temporarily assigned to NOAA's National Marine Fisheries Service and ships formerly assigned to ESSA′s Environmental Research Laboratories to form the unified NOAA fleet operated by the National Ocean Survey's Office of Fleet Operations. As a reflection of its diversifying responsibilities, the National Ocean Survey was renamed the National Ocean Service in 1983.

== See also ==
- Nancy Foster, former director of the National Ocean Service.
