= Coral Reef Conservation Program =

Intergovernmental organization

NOAA Coral Reef Conservation Program
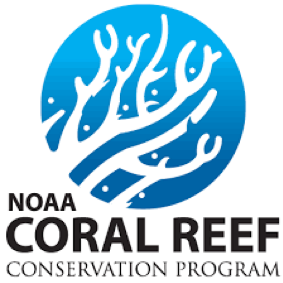
- Abbreviation: CRCP
- Formation: 2000
- Type: Intergovernmental organisation
- Headquarters: Silver Spring, Maryland
- Key people: Jennifer Koss (director)
- Parent organization: National Oceanic and Atmospheric Administration
- Website: https://coralreef.noaa.gov

The Coral Reef Conservation Program (CRCP) is a partnership between National Oceanic and Atmospheric Administration (NOAA) agencies, established in 2000. The program is a multidisciplinary approach, initiated by the NOAA, to managing and understanding coral reef ecosystems through research and the publication of data to support relevant partners involved in coral reef restoration.

== Background ==
The CRCP was established by the Coral Reef Conservation Act 2000 and Presidential Executive Order 13089, in order to fulfil the NOAA's obligations under these statutes.

The main role of the CRCP is to gather and present scientific information that coastal and marine resource managers and other decision-makers require, to address the various threats facing coral reef ecosystems in U.S. and surrounding waters. The CRCP's priority threats are climate change, unsustainable fishing practices and pollution. Monitoring the effects of these threats on the condition of U.S. coral reef ecosystems is the primary responsibility of the CRCP. Each year NOAA divers survey coral reefs at nearly 1600 sites to monitor these effects. All research and data collected by the CRCP is publicly available on the Coral Reef Information System. Other than ecosystem monitoring, other tasks conducted by the CRCP include mapping of coral reef habitats, forecasting oceanographic conditions, and communications and data management.

As well as conducting research, the CRCP also financially supports a number of partners including institutions of higher education and not-for-profit organisations, by awarding grants to projects involved in coral reef ecosystem management and restoration. The program aims to fund at least $8 million in grants each year to partners involved in coral reef conservation management projects. In the 2018 Fiscal Year, the program contributed more than $26 million in funding towards coral reef projects across the U.S. through grants and agreements. Funding for the CRCP is provided by the NOAA and the U.S. Fish and Wildlife Service.

== Agencies Involved ==
The CRCP is made up of several NOAA Line Offices including the National Ocean Service, the National Marine Fisheries Service, the Office of Oceanic and Atmospheric Research, and the National Environmental Satellite, Data and Information Service.

- The National Ocean Service is the NOAA partner that is responsible for overseeing budget activities for the CRCP and other NOAA agencies. The National Ocean Service also conducts a number of partnered activities with the CRCP including mapping and monitoring of coral reef ecosystems.
- The National Marine Fisheries Service is an agency focused on reducing and controlling the effects of overfishing, and works closely with the CRCP to manage the effects of overfishing on coral reef ecosystems
- The National Environmental Satellite, Data and Information Service is another NOAA agency whose main role is to monitor coral reef indices through sensors. This data is shared with NOAA bodies including the CRCP, which is then applied to management decision making.
- NOAA's Oceanic and Atmospheric Research body coordinates data collection relating to atmospheric and oceanic parameters such as climate variability and wave movement. Oceanic and Atmospheric Research is another partner of the CRCP, providing the organisation with data.

The CRCP also works closely with a number of external partners including state and territorial governments, academic institutions and non-government and intergovernmental organisations.

== Objectives ==
The mission of the Coral Reef Conservation Program is outlined in the Coral Reef Conservation Act and can be summarised as to "protect, conserve and restore coral reef resources by maintaining healthy ecosystem functioning". The objectives of the program are consolidated into the following four key pillars, as outlined in the NOAA governmental webpage.

=== Increasing Resilience to Climate Change ===
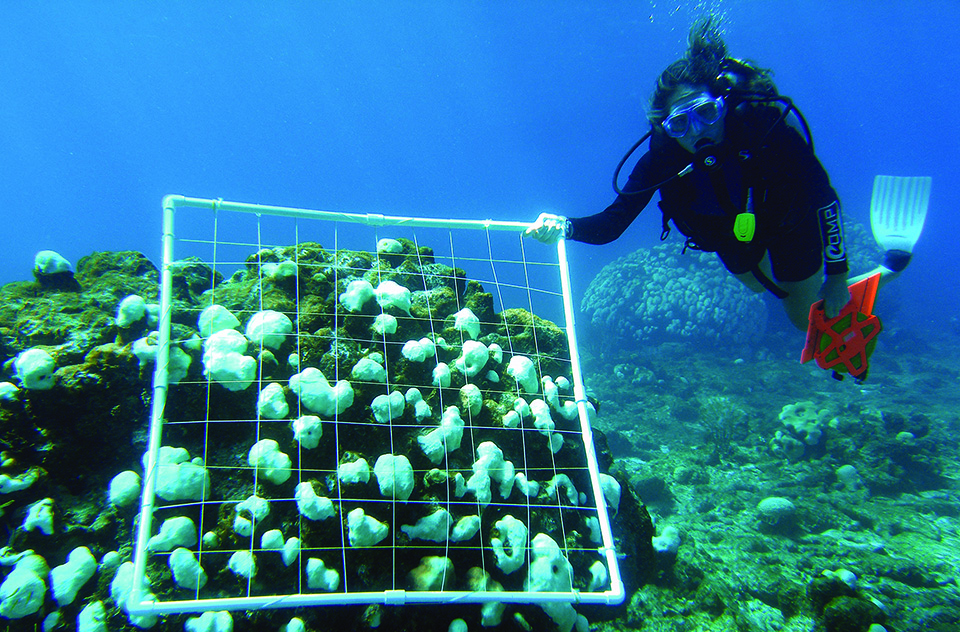
NOAA CRCP scuba diver surveying bleached corals

The CRCP has adopted a resilience-based approach to addressing the issue of climate change which poses a significant threat to coral reef ecosystems by instigating coral bleaching. A resilience-based approach involves increasing the capacity of coral reef ecosystems to recover from changes in parameters and continue normal functioning. Resilience based management utilises pro-active responses rather than reactive responses that traditional management strategies tend to adopt. The CRCP's main responsibility under this approach is to continue to conduct and provide partners with the relevant information and data necessary to successfully initiate resilience-based management practices. In 2014, CRCP scientists developed precise climate and bleaching thermal stress prediction tools. By anticipating stress events such as global bleaching outbreaks, managers can make proactive decisions to minimise the overall effects on coral reef ecosystems. One of the CRCP's targets is for at least seven of the organisation's partners to apply such climate resilience related data to climate-change orientated projects, by 2025. The CRCP also has the responsibility of initiating ongoing communication with government bodies and federal management partners on the importance of resilience-based management for the future viability of coral reefs. To fulfil this responsibility, the CRCP has developed communication plans and response plans to present information and data in a systematic and coherent manner for federal decision and policy makers. Crisis response plans are made up of early warning frameworks to prepare and protect ecosystems in response to global threat events such as coral bleaching, disease and invasive species outbreaks, and natural weather disasters such as tropical storms.

=== Reducing Land-based Sources of Pollution ===
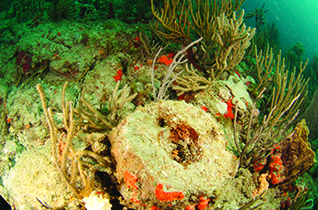
Sediment-covered coral in Florida. Photo taken by the NOAA.

Land-based sources of pollution pose a significant threat on coral reef ecosystems by interrupting natural processes and functioning. Reducing this threat is another pillar under the objectives of the CRCP. The CRCP regulates and supports a number of watershed management initiatives including research to identify sources of pollution, conducting studies to understand the impacts of land-based sources of pollution on coral reefs and providing financial and technical assistance to partners' watershed management responses. A key partnership under this pillar is the 'Watershed Partnership Initiative' with the U.S Coral Reef Task Force, which focuses on reducing land-based pollutants by implementing specific and integrated action responses. Watershed management includes the implementation of vegetated buffer protection along coasts, land conservation and the responsible treatment of wastewater.

=== Improving Fisheries' Sustainability ===
The success of the CRCP's ability to improve the sustainability of U.S. fisheries relies heavily on partnerships with relevant fishery management councils and agencies. There are two key strategies under this pillar, both of which involve cooperating with external partners. One of the strategies is to provide key data for coral reef fisheries management. Data collected by the CRCP is used by a number of fisheries managers working under the Magnuson-Stevens Fishery Conservation and Management Act in order to ensure that the ecological role and function that marine species play in coral reef ecosystems is sustained. The second strategy is to assist partner agencies in effectively managing coral reef fisheries. The CRCP aims for 50 percent of relevant partners to adopt effective management tools of which have been developed cooperatively. One way that the CRCP assists federal partners interested in the sustainable management of fisheries, is by supporting effective implementation and management of marine protected areas. Marine protected areas are valuable tools for restoring overexploited ecosystems and protecting fisheries.

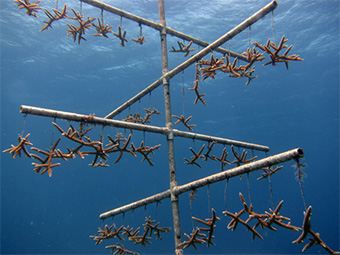
NOAA coral nurseries help to restore coral populations

=== Restoring Viable Coral Populations ===
The final pillar to the CRCP's strategy plan is the restoration of coral reef ecosystems. This involves supporting research of herbivore replenishment processes and collecting further data to support the prevention of avoidable losses of coral, increasing resilience and improving long-term coral health. In order to successfully enhance resilience the CRCP has recognised the need to conduct restoration projects on an international level by continuing to build foreign partnership. Restoration projects include resilience interventions such as assisted genetic adaptation, the manipulation of symbiotic relationships and larval propagation.

== Projects and Initiatives ==
=== Status reports ===
One of the CRCP's most significant contributions to the management of U.S. coral reef ecosystems is the development of a periodic, national-level assessment on the condition of U.S. coral reef areas. The CRCP partnered with the Integration and Application Network (IAN) at the University of Maryland Centre for Environmental Science (UMES) in forming 'status reports' to present the data collected from the periodic assessments. The status reports fulfil one of the CRCP's responsibilities, as mandated by the Coral Reef Conservation Act 2000, to build an 'integrated observing system' to monitor the condition of coral reefs over time.

Both biological and physical data is collected by UMES-IAN and NOAA scientists in coral reef areas including: American Samoa, the Commonwealth of the Northern Marianna Islands, Guam, Hawaiian Archipelago, and the Pacific Remote Islands. The status reports include the assessment of several indicators which are synthesised into overall condition scores. The indicators are based on four main categories: coral and algae, fish, climate and human connections.

The purpose of the reports is to establish both a baseline and a record to track changes over time and evaluate the overall conditions of the U.S. coral reef ecosystems. The reports are also part of CRCP's larger initiative to communicate complex information in a clear and concise manner in order to inform communities and decision-makers.

=== Coral Reef Information System (CoRIS) ===
The CRCP operates an information database known as 'CoRIS', that provides public access to all coral reef data and information collected and managed by the NOAA. This information portal is a key function of the CRCP, making data accessible to all coral reef management decision-makers. CoRIS is made up of a number of databases including the 'NOAA Deep Sea Coral Data Portal', which provides access to data relating to deep sea coral and sponges.

=== Outreach and education activities ===
One of the CRCP's responsibilities as outlined in the Coral Reef Conservation Act is to build public awareness and knowledge on the importance of sustainable management of coral reefs. The CRCP has conducted a number of educational and training workshops, and has also distributed a range of educational material regarding coral reef management, to the public. In 2017, the CRCP developed an educational video named "A Guide to Assessing Coral Reef Resilience for Decision Support". The video was awarded first place at the 2018 CINEFISH film festival, held in Mexico.

=== Funding and grants ===
The CRCP funds a wide variety of coral reef management projects ranging from school science excursions, projects concerning the identification and mapping of coral ecosystems, the publication of educational materials and restoration initiatives.

==== Funding for hurricanes Irma and Maria ====
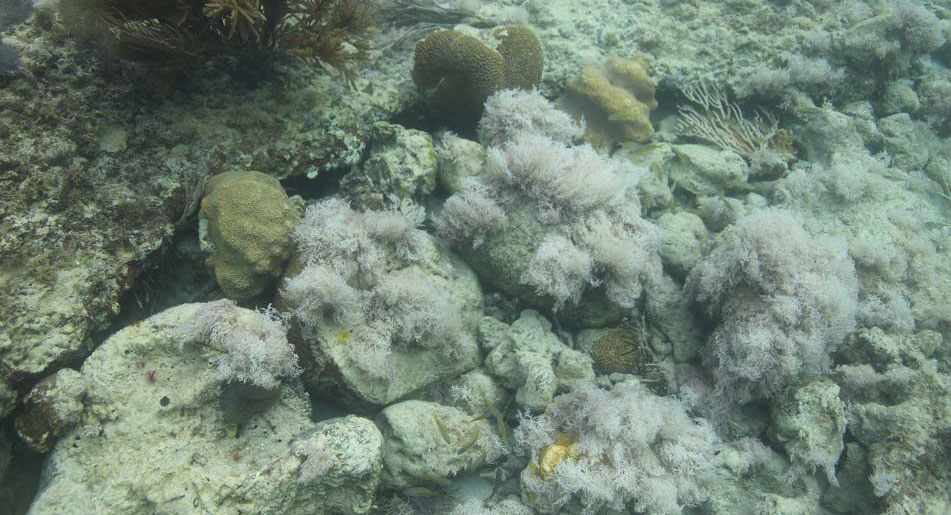
CRCP scientists are concerned with the rapid growth of macroalgal on coral, which is distinguishable by its pink, fleshy appearance.

In 2017 Hurricanes Irma and Maria caused severe damage to the coral reefs in Florida and Puerto Rico, impacting ecosystem vulnerability and resilience. Funding to assist coral restoration was provided by the NOAA's CRCP and partners including the National Fish and Wildlife Foundation and National Marine Fisheries Service. The program led efforts to assess the impact of the hurricanes on local coral reef ecosystems and restore damage. The funds were used towards research and assessment to collect data on the impact of the hurricanes on the reefs and other crucial information, vital for effective decision-making. It was found that overturned coral reefs in Puerto Rico appeared to have macroalgal overgrowth, as evident in the figure, as a result of stress from the 2017 hurricanes. Scientists are concerned with the rapid growth of this macroalgae, and such findings are vital for effective management decision-making for the coral reef ecosystem

==== Funding the Hawaii Coastal Uses Mapping Project ====
The CRCP funds a number of projects and programs that are interested in the sustainable management of U.S. coral reef ecosystems, including the Hawaii Coastal Uses Mapping Project. The project involved gathering data and information on the impact of human activity near coastal environments on coral reef ecosystems surrounding Hawaii, by using a participatory geographic information systems (PGIS) methodology. PGIS is an effective means to obtain critical sociospatial information which includes data regarding the location of resources and the location of ecosystem related concerns, and is very useful information for a number of stakeholders involved in coastal ecosystem management including state and federal managers. Prior to the implementation of the program there was very little sociospatial data collected on the Hawaii coast.

==== Funding Research ====
The CRCP provides financial support to a number of institutional organisations with the purpose of funding and supporting the development of research papers interested in the restoration and protection of coral reef ecosystems. In 2015 the NOAA CRCP funded a study run by the Florida International University, which found that 'grazing fish can help save imperilled coral reefs'. The CRCP has also funded a number of studies on the impacts of climate change on coral reefs and the effectiveness of new management strategies. The article 'Climate-smart Design for Ecosystem Management' from the Environmental Management Journal, was partly funded by the CRCP and examines and assesses adaptation strategies for coral reefs.
