= National Coastal Zone Management Program =

Program of the US government

- Formation: 1972
- Type: Federal Government
- Region served: 34 states and territories
- Main organ: NOAA
- Parent organization: NOAA Office for Coastal Management
- Budget: FY 2016

The National Coastal Zone Management Program is a program of the US government that works with states and territories to protect, restore, and responsibly develop coastal communities, resources, and economies. The program is housed within the National Oceanic and Atmospheric Administration (NOAA) Office for Coastal Management. NOAA is an agency within the Department of Commerce. Participation is voluntary and 34 states and territories participate. States and territories agree to develop state programs that uphold the requirements specified in the founding legislation, the Coastal Zone Management Act of 1972.

Every five years, participants review their programs in one or more of the following areas: wetlands, coastal hazards, public access, marine debris, aquaculture, cumulative and secondary impacts of development, special area management plans, ocean and Great Lakes resources, and energy and government facility siting.

NOAA and the U.S. Environmental Protection Agency also jointly administer the Coastal Nonpoint Pollution Control program. The stated goal of the program is to reduce polluted runoff to coastal waters. The six main runoff sources are agriculture, forestry, urban areas, wetlands, modified shorelines and stream channels, and vegetative and other treatment systems. This program was established in 1990 by Section 6217 of the Coastal Zone Act Reauthorization Amendments.

== New Jersey ==
New Jersey's Coastal Management Program is part of the National Coastal Zone Management Program. The NJCMP is a network of offices working within the Department of Environmental Protection. An important task of New Jersey's Coastal Management Program is to ensure that coastal resources and ecosystems are conserved to enhance sustainable coastal communities. Some of the issues the program addresses are sustainable and resilient coastal community planning, climate change, ocean planning, and planning for energy facilities.

This management program is a voluntary partnership between the federal government and US coastal and Great Lake States. The state of New Jersey developed this program to manage, protect, and develop its coastal lands and waters. New Jersey develops a comprehensive five-year strategy to address the high priority needs of the Coastal Management Act.

== See also ==
- National Oceanic and Atmospheric Administration
