= Office of Response and Restoration =

The Office of Response and Restoration (OR&R) is a program office of the National Ocean Service within the National Oceanic and Atmospheric Administration (NOAA). It acts as a natural resource trustee, supporting responses to oil and hazardous material releases and coordinating restoration activities when coastal and marine environments are injured.

== Oil and chemical spill response ==
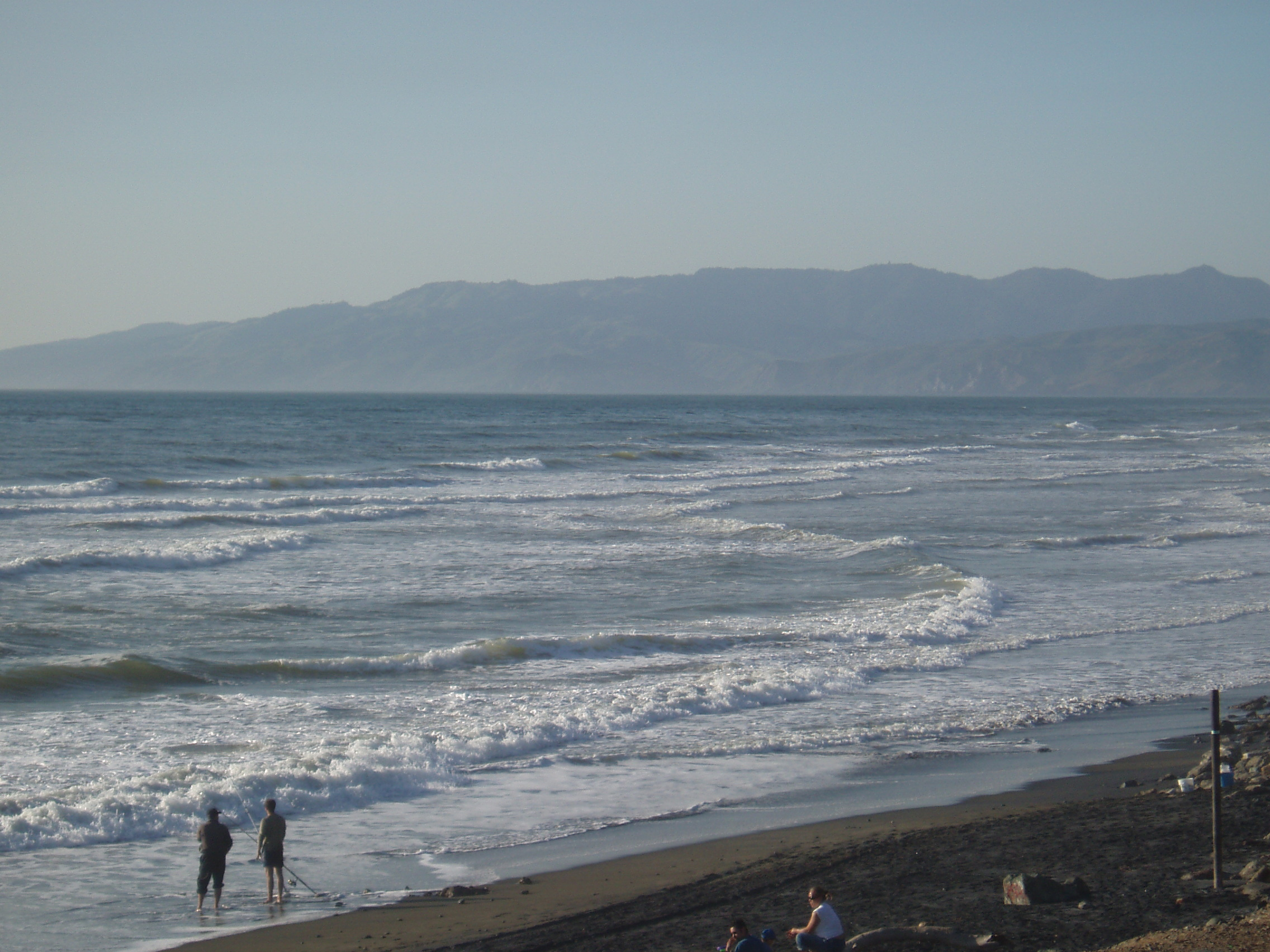
The shore of the Pacific Ocean in San Francisco, California.

OR&R’s interdisciplinary spill team provides scientific and technical support during oil and chemical incidents. Activities include forecasting the movement and behavior of spilled substances, assessing potential risks to natural resources, and advising on response and cleanup strategies. OR&R also participates in federal response coordination through NOAA’s role on the National Response Team and Regional Response Teams, and supports preparedness through research, training, and spill simulations.

== Natural resource assessment and restoration ==
As a natural resource trustee, OR&R works with federal, state and local agencies, communities and industry to evaluate environmental and economic injuries to NOAA trust resources, provide technical advice, and develop cleanup and restoration recommendations. The office contributes to damage assessments and restoration planning following pollution incidents and at contaminated sites.

== Pribilof Island remediation ==
Since 1999, OR&R has coordinated cleanup and remediation on the Pribilof Islands, Alaska, addressing waste and landfill sites associated with earlier federal activities related to the commercial fur seal harvest. By the mid-2010s, NOAA reported that most contaminated areas had been remediated, enabling the transfer of federal land to local entities.

== Marine debris cleanup and prevention ==
OR&R administers NOAA’s Marine Debris Program, re-established in 2005. The program supports national and international efforts to reduce the occurrence of marine debris, assess its impacts, and promote prevention strategies, including funding projects with agencies, academic institutions and community groups.

== See also ==
- Ecology
- Earth science
- Natural environment
- Nature
- Conservation movement
- Sustainability
- Biodiversity
