= Office of Space Commerce =

Office within the NOAA

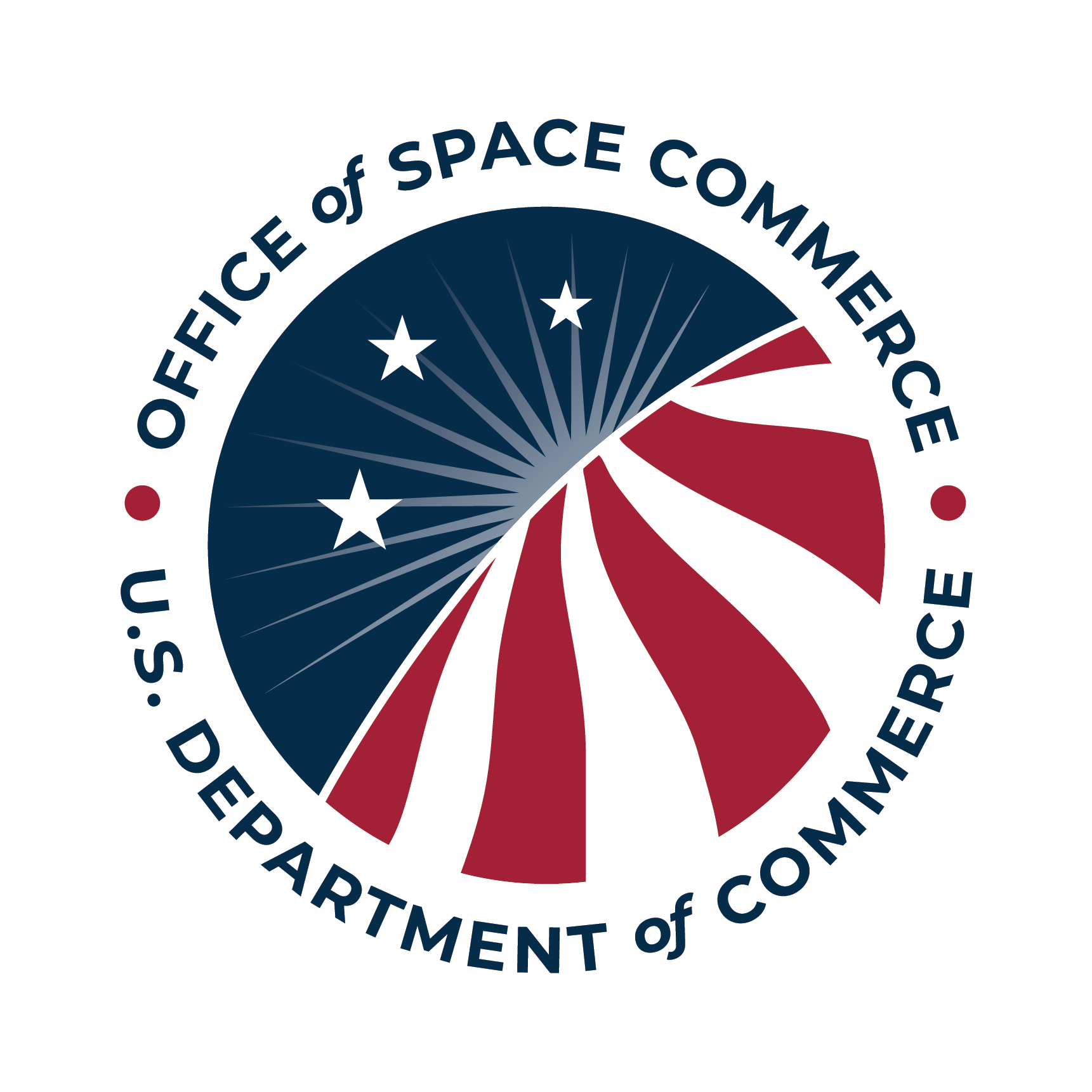

Agency overview
- Jurisdiction: Federal government of the United States

The Office of Space Commerce (OSC) is an office within National Oceanic and Atmospheric Administration which is part of the United States Department of Commerce. It is currently one of several offices within the department that are responsible for overseeing and promoting economic activity in space. The office is small in size, and its first director was Kevin O'Connell. In January 2021, Mark Paese took over as acting director. Taylor Jordan is the current director of the Office of Space Commerce.

In May 2018, Wilbur Ross, the secretary of commerce announced plans to consolidate the Office with the Commercial Remote Sensing Regulatory Affairs (CRSRA) Office to form a new administration, the Space Policy Advancing Commercial Enterprise (SPACE) Administration. The goal of the new agency would be to streamline the regulatory process. These plans were subsequently abandoned.

== Traffic Coordination System for Space ==
The Traffic Coordination System for Space (TraCSS) is the OSC's civil space traffic coordination system. When fully operational, TraCSS will enhance space situational awareness by providing frequent conjunction data messages to satellite operators. NOAA awarded the systems integrator role for the TraCSS system to Parsons Corporation in March 2024. TraCSS entered phase 1.0 beta testing on September 30, 2024, with nine operators participating in the testing phase: The Aerospace Corporation, Eutelsat OneWeb, Georgia Tech, Intelsat, Iridium, Maxar, NOAA, Planet Labs and Telesat.

TraCSS is intended to replace the United States Space Surveillance Network's Space-Track service by the end of 2025.
