= Mussel Watch Program =

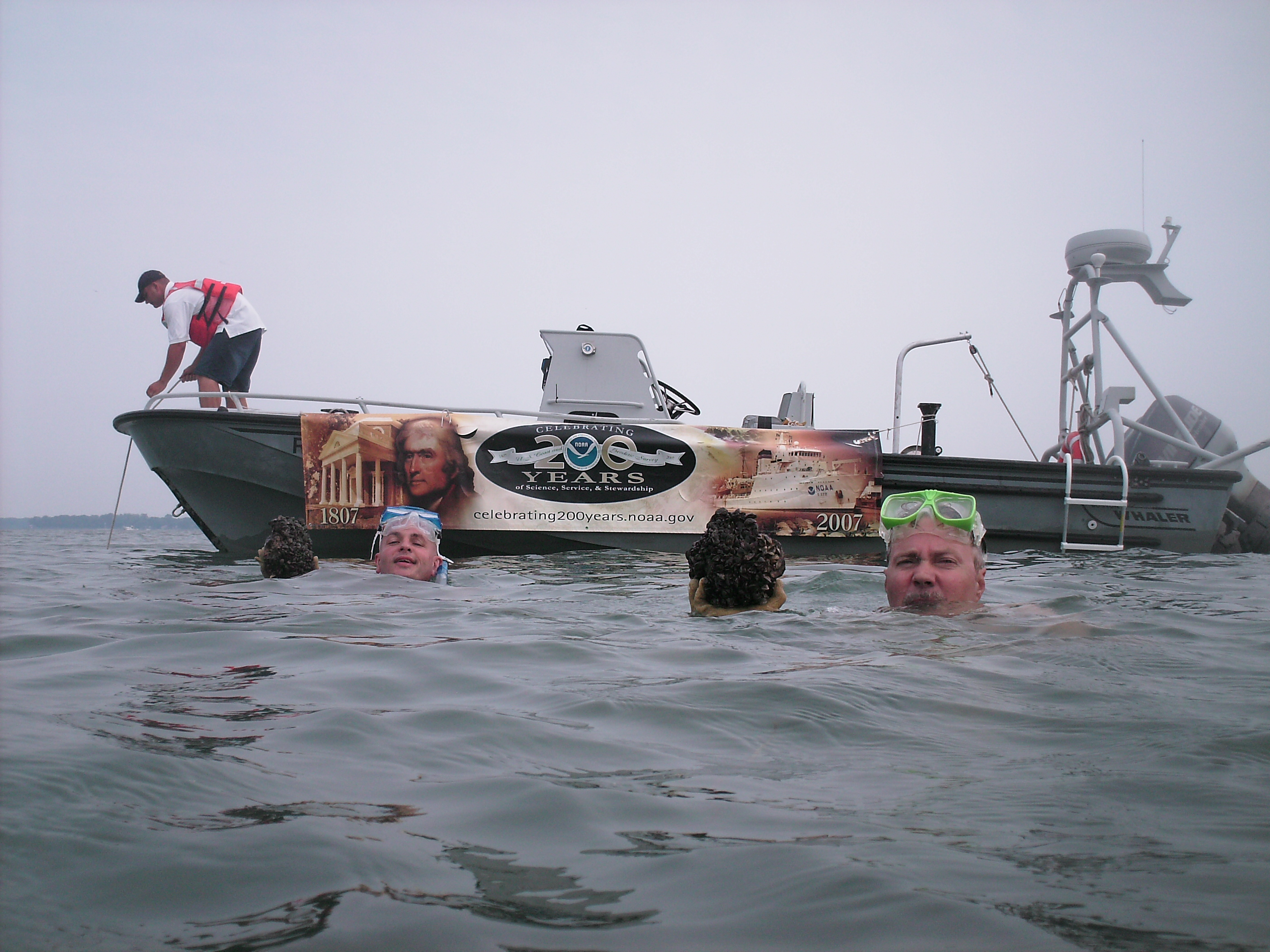
Scientists from NCCOS' Center for Coastal Monitoring and Assessment, Office of Coast Survey, and NOAA's Great Lakes Environmental Research Laboratory collect zebra mussels attached to rocks in Lake Erie for NCCOS' Mussel Watch Program.

The U.S. National Oceanic and Atmospheric Administration (NOAA) National Status and Trends (NS&T) Mussel Watch Program is a water contaminant monitoring program that started in 1986..The program was inspired by Dr. Ed Goldberg at Scripps Institute of Oceanography, but was conceived and designed at a workshop sponsored by NOAA, held at Battelle Ocean Sciences in 1984, and led by Dr. Paul D. Boehm. It is the longest running continuous contaminant monitoring program of its kind in the United States. Mussel Watch monitors the concentration of contaminants in bivalves (mussels and oysters) and sediments in the coastal waters of the U.S., including the Great Lakes, to monitor bivalve health and by extension the health of their local and regional environment.

Mussel Watch consults with experts to determine appropriate contaminants to monitor; these include dichlorodiphenyltrichloroethane (DDT), polycyclic aromatic hydrocarbons (PAHs), and polychlorinated biphenyls (PCBs). As of 2008, Mussel Watch monitors approximately 140 analytes. In addition to the effects of contaminants, Mussel Watch is able to assess the effects of natural disasters, such as the 2005 Hurricane Katrina, and environmental disasters, such as the 2010 Deepwater Horizon oil spill. Data collected by Mussel Watch can also be used to monitor the effectiveness of coastal remediation. The Mussel Watch Program utilized its 20 years of monitoring data to effectively analyze the impacts of Hurricane Katrina and has affected regulatory decisions based on the data it has collected on bivalve parasites.

== History ==
NOAA describes the goal of Mussel Watch as "to support ecosystem-based management through an integrated nationwide program of environmental monitoring, assessment and research to describe the status and trends of our nation's estuaries and coasts." Mussel Watch is a program that monitors the health of bivalves for contaminants along the coasts of the United States. This program was launched in 1986 and since then is the longest government-run monitoring program that has national influence. It was made in response to a legislative mandate to preserve the marine environment. In 2008 they released an assessment of their data from 1986 through 2005. In this report, concentrations of many different metals and organic pollutants are shown over the two decades of data collection. Using this set of data, trends can be identified for different coastal areas. Starting in 2000, the scientists that NOAA sent out to collect the mussels changed companies and the Mussel Watch program began employing citizen scientists to collect the mussels; this approach saved a good deal of money for the program. This can be seen on the local level in Washington State where The Snohomish County's Natural Marine Resources Committee coordinated with the Mussel Watch program in 2007 to employ citizens to collect samples from the nearshore water Snohomish County. In 2010 and 2012 Western Washington University students assisted Whatcom County Public Works. Mussel Watch originally monitored areas known for contamination where data would be easily found and monitored for trends in the toxicity data. Now the focus is to shift to areas of concern directed by organizations like the Environmental Protection Agency (EPA). Instead of focusing just on trends in the data Mussel Watch is looking to see if a given policy has actually made a positive impact on a specific environment.

== Structure ==
=== National level ===
Mussel Watch uses a combination of national oversight from NOAA with a network of regional and local groups to monitor coastal health throughout the United States. NOAA and its National Centers for Coastal Ocean Science (NCCOS) has a staff of scientists throughout the United States and partners with other Federal, State, non-governmental organization, and private sector partners throughout the world to work together towards achieving the goals of the Mussel Watch Program. Contamination in one coastal region can lead to effects in areas thousands of miles away and having a nationwide monitoring program enables NOAA to track these effects. A performance based quality assurance process (QA) is used by the Mussel Watch Program to maintain data quality. The National Institute of Standards and Technology (NIST) and the National Research Council of Canada (NRC) assist analytic laboratories in exercises to ensure that data collected from all labs have comparable accuracy and precision. The QA process reduces intralaboratory and interlaboratory variation.

=== Regional and local level ===
A complete list of Mussel Watch regions follows.

- Great Lakes (Wisconsin, Illinois, Indiana, Michigan, Ohio, and New York states)
- Northwest (Oregon, Washington, and Alaska)
- Northern California (North of Point Conception)
- Southern California (Point Conception and South)
- Western Gulf Coast (Alabama, Mississippi, Louisiana, and Texas)
- Eastern Gulf Coast (Florida Gulf Coast)
- Southeast (South Carolina, Georgia, and Florida Atlantic coast)
- Middle Atlantic (New Jersey, Delaware, Maryland, Virginia, and North Carolina)
- Lower Northeast (Massachusetts, Rhode Island, Connecticut, New York, New Jersey, and Delaware)
- Upper Northeast (Maine and New Hampshire)

NOAA currently supports over 65 active citizen science projects, including Mussel Watch. In 2013 a NOAA Citizen Science Community of Practice was formed to help the citizen scientists compile and share best practices, share resources, and provide a searchable database of NOAA's citizen science projects. The community of over 120 members continues to work to aid citizen scientists. An example of the collaboration between national and local groups is the Washington state 2009/10 Mussel Watch Pilot Project. The Washington Department of Fish and Wildlife's (WDFW) Puget Sound Assessment and Monitoring Program (PSAMP), Snohomish County Marine Resources Committee (MRC), Snohomish County Public Works-Surface Water Management, Washington Sea Grant, and NOAA's Mussel Watch collaborated to; "conduct field-sampling for the 2009/10 Mussel Watch season in Washington waters, evaluate the possibility of merging field sampling with existing toxic contaminant monitoring in Puget Sound, demonstrate and evaluate the use citizen scientists as a primary resource for conducting field work and investigate the feasibility of Mussel Watch as a monitoring tool in Puget Sound." This involved a representative from NOAA assisting PSAMP staff and volunteers with a successful sampling of all Mussel Watch sites. The result of this pilot project was a significant reduction in labor time of professional staff in the field due to the assistance and proper training of citizen scientist volunteers. Proper training of volunteers is necessary to maintain consistent and accurate collection methods.

== Program design ==
=== Contaminants of interest ===
More than 140 chemical contaminants (analytes) are monitored by the Mussel Watch Program. The EPA lists many of these analytes as Priority Pollutants under the Clean Water Act. They have been chosen based on their bioavailability, possible uptake and storage into animal tissues, toxicity to aquatic life, and potential harm to humans.

==== Metals ====
Metals measured in the Mussel Watch Program include aluminum, antimony, arsenic, cadmium, chromium, copper, iron, lead, manganese, mercury, nickel, selenium, silicon, silver, thallium, tin, and zinc. These metals come from both natural and anthropogenic sources. Different bivalve species have different bioaccumulation abilities for trace metals, and as a result oysters will accumulate about 10 times more zinc and copper than mussels. Mussels will accumulate about 3 times more lead than oysters. A report over a 20-year period released by the Mussel Watch Program in 2008 found that higher metal concentrations are found in urbanized and industrialized regions, and there is no significant difference in metal concentrations between the East Coast, the West Coast, and the Great Lakes regions. There is an increase in metal concentrations nationwide over time.

==== Organics ====
As of 2008, the organic contaminants monitored by Mussel Watch included 51 PCB congeners (out of a possible 209), 65 PAHs, DDT, butyltin, chlordane, and dieldrin. A complete list is available at http://NSandT.noaa.gov. Most of the organic contaminants monitored by Mussel Watch have an anthropogenic source, with PAHs being an exception as they are derived from both natural processes and anthropogenic sources. PCB congeners were selected based on a list of criteria including that the chosen congeners are already being measured by other scientific organizations. Organic contaminants can be compared across all sites and all species used by Mussel Watch. The same 20-year report discussed in "Metals" found that, similar to metals, elevated levels of organic contaminants are also found in urbanized and industrialized regions. Organic contaminants were found at every site.

=== Histopathology ===
"The histopathology component of the Mussel Watch Program, quantifies the stage of gamete development, and the prevalence of nearly 70 diseases and parasites found in mussels and oysters. Trends in histopathology data may help to assess the effects of global warming."

=== Sampling design ===
==== Location ====
In 1986 the Mussel Watch Program only sampled 145 sites, but as of 2008 that amount has grown to approximately 300 active monitoring sites in the continental U.S., Alaska, Puerto Rico and Hawaii. Many of these sites coincide with the 1976-1978 EPA Mussel Watch sites, and new sites have been chosen after consulting with state officials and academic professionals about ideal placement. Criteria for site selection includes;

- Indigenous populations of mussels must be present
- Shellfish beds must be large enough for repeat sampling
- Must be natural substrate
- Avoid point source pollution
- Select areas not authorized for shellfish harvesting for consumption

The Mussel Watch Program does not use caged mussels, instead it uses naturally occurring bivalves. Sites were distributed 10–100 km apart to better represent large coastal areas which enable NOAA to more accurately construct a nationwide assessment. As a result, Mussel Watch can be used to "monitor spatial distributions and temporal trends of chemical concentrations in coastal and estuarine regions of the US."

==== Species ====
There is not a single species of mussel or oyster that is common to all US coastal regions, so the species for a given site are chosen based on their abundance and ease of collection. "Mussels (Mytilus species) are collected from the North Atlantic and Pacific coasts, oysters (Crassostrea virginica) from the mid-Atlantic (Delaware Bay) southward and along the Gulf Coast, and zebra mussels (Dreissena species), an invasive species, are collected from sites in the Great Lakes."

==== Collection ====
The majority of field collection and laboratory work is conducted by non-NOAA contract laboratories. At least once annually between November and March volunteers at each Mussel Watch site collect two groups of 50-100 bivalves. The samples must be collected within three weeks of the date the site was first sampled. This means that if a sample was first taken on April 15, 1987, then all future samples in subsequent years must be taken within three weeks of April 15. One group is used for testing organic contaminants while the other group is used for trace elements (metals). Sediment from a site exposed to the same water mass as the corresponding bivalve site and no more than 2 km away is collected concurrently with the bivalves. Sediment criteria measured includes total organic and carbonate carbon, moisture content, particle size, concentration of Clostridium perfringens, and concentration of Coprostanol (this was no longer measured after 1989). Different methods of bivalve collection are used depending on the site characteristics. A bivalve dredge is used in water deeper than 2 m, stainless steel tongs are used in 2-2.5 m deep water with a soft bottom, stainless steel pitch forks or quahog rakes are used in water less than 1 m deep, and collection by hand is done at some shoreline sites. The bivalves are then cleaned, packed in iced containers, and shipped to the appropriate analytical laboratory within two days of collection.

==== Analysis ====
NOAA awarded TDI-Brooks International with a five-year contract to analyze sediment and bivalve tissue chemistry from September 21, 2009 to September 20, 2014. TDI-Brooks has also conducted the testing for the previous ten years from 1999 to 2009. TDI-Brooks and their affiliate B&B Laboratories conducts the organic chemical analysis, Rutgers University is subcontracted to conduct the histopathology analysis, and Texas A&M is subcontracted to conduct the metal and nutrient analysis. Due to the Deepwater Horizon oil spill the resources at these labs were shifted towards chemical analyses of the high-priority samples for the Gulf of Mexico. This caused significant delays, in some cases of more than a year, of analysis results for the Mussel Watch Program.

== Projects and publications ==
=== Past projects ===
National Tissue and Sediment Sample Archive: Many of NOAA's projects incorporate different programs to obtain the desired information. The National Status and Trends program of NOAA's started using mussel, oyster, and zebra mussel samples collected under the Mussel Watch Program in 1985 as a means to start specimen banking. This bank of samples allows NOAA to take a snapshot of certain contaminants of interest at any point in time allowing, through the use of analytical techniques, the tissue concentrations of the desired compound. This allows regulators to better understand the history of a certain compound. Another project that took advantage of the Mussel Watch program was the assessment of coastal waters impacted by Hurricane Katrina in 2005. By examining shallow waters for concentrations of DDT, conventional chlorinated pesticides, PCBs, PAHs, and metals after the hurricane NOAA scientists were able to compare results with the past 20 years of monitoring data from the same area. This consistent and historical record of contaminants from the Mussel Watch program proved effective in analyzing the impacts of Hurricane Katrina. Pathology of parasites in bivalves, using oysters and mussels collected via the Mussel Watch program tissue samples were investigated for parasites. The change in abundance of parasites geographically and over time can be a good indicator of exposure to a contaminant. The results of these pathology screenings have been used to show levels of contamination and have affected regulatory decisions.

==== Notable publications ====
Mussel Watch publishes reports approximately every 2 years concerning most sites and regions. Some compilations and other notable publications historically produced include:

- An Assessment of Two Decades of Contaminant Monitoring in the Nation's Coastal Zone
- Current Use Pesticides (1994–97)
- Radionuclide Concentrations in Bivalves (1990)
- An Assessment of Polybrominated Diphenyl Ethers (PBDEs) in Sediments and Bivalves of the U.S Coastal Zone
- A complete list of projects and publications can be found at: NCCOS Mussel Watch Contaminant Monitoring

Arguably the most important publication to come from the Mussel Watch program is "An Assessment of Two Decades of Contaminant Monitoring in the Nation's Coastal Zone". This publication was intended for use by academics, concerned citizens, and governmental and other regulatory agencies. This report includes trends and relative levels of 140 different chemicals at 300 sampling sites across the US and Puerto Rico. Spanning the years of 1986-2006 this report has served to inform policy makers and interested individuals outside of regulatory agencies. Another notable publication is the report titled, An Assessment of Polybrominated Diphenyl Ethers (PBDEs) in Sediments and Bivalves of the U.S. Coastal Zone. This report investigated the relatively new class of compounds known as Polybrominated Diphenyl Ethers (PBDEs) which act as flame retardants. These are found in many consumer plastics, textiles, electronics, and furniture cushion material. This report showed the relative levels of contamination geographically and linked high levels of PBDE to areas of high human population density. This has been significant due to the potential threat these compounds pose for global distribution.

=== Current projects ===
Great Lakes Mussel Watch Supports the President's Great Lakes Restoration Initiative is one of the many ongoing projects by Mussel Watch. This project, receiving attention and funding from the President's Great Lakes Restoration Initiative (GLRI), is a typical example of the types of projects Mussel Watch is being used for. Looking at Areas of Concern (AOC) in the US Great Lakes, Mussel Watch has increased sampling sizes and rates as well as updated techniques including doing caged mussel testing when shellfish beds are not available. By looking at both sediment and mussel tissue concentrations researches have been able to better identify remediation efforts at Great Lake AOC. Like many other current Mussel Watch projects, the GLRI is using both historical data from Mussel Watch as well as increasingly more temporally and spatially prioritized data leading to more robust data sets far more applicable to specific AOC.

== Significance ==
Mussels are the organism of choice for monitoring contaminant levels in the coastal regions for a number of reasons. Most mussels are generally sessile and cannot move to another location if their environment has become contaminated; this makes them good measures of environmental pollution. Mussels do not readily metabolize some of the organics that vertebrates do, making them a better choice when tracking substances such as PAHs. In addition, most mussels are filter feeders and filter water through their bodies to feed. This filtration makes them prime targets for picking up contaminants in the water. Mussels can provide information on if a system is recovering and if a remediation or cleanup effort is effective. In a successful remediation effort a decline of contaminants in the organisms is expected. An example of this is in Lavaca Bay, Texas, which is a site that has been contaminated due to chronic mercury releases from a nearby facility. By monitoring the mercury levels in oysters over several years it was discovered that the mercury content in the bay was decreasing. Due to the nature of their filter feeding, bivalves allow Mussel Watch to tracks changes in contamination levels in the environment by monitoring bivalve tissue concentrations. This is important because it can show whether a policy that is meant to protect and clean the environment or an ecosystem is actually working. Mussel Watch can be used to evaluate current policies to determine what, if any, changes need to be made to ensure that there is an improvement in environmental health.

== See also ==
- Bivalvia
- Citizen science
