= WeoGeo =

- Company type: Private
- Industry: geospatial, content management, Geographic information systems
- Founded: Tampa, Florida, 2006
- Founder: W. Paul Bissett, Dave Kohler
- Headquarters: Portland, Oregon, U.S. 45°30′8.56″N 122°40′30.49″W
- Number of employees: 15
- Website: http://weogeo.com/

WeoGeo was acquired by Trimble Navigation in 2014 and became known as "Trimble Data Marketplace." It allowed users to discover, transform and download geospatial data. WeoGeo launched at the 2007 Where 2.0 Conference in San Jose, CA. WeoGeo and Safe Software announced a partnership in 2008 to bring FME Server to the cloud on Amazon Web Services.

WeoGeo was co-founded by W. Paul Bissett and Dave Kohler.

== History ==
WeoGeo was established in 2006, and spun out of the Florida Environmental Research Institute, where the founders had worked together for nine years. It was founded to enable greater productivity in the geospatial industry by removing the vertical barriers to geo-content creation and sharing. In 2007, WeoGeo was a finalist in the Amazon Web Services StartUp Challenge. WeoGeo released their Library Appliance in the July, 2008 concurrent with their Market service. They released their Library, a monthly, Software-as-a-Service version of their Appliance, in March, 2009. WeoGeo left private beta on May 6, 2010 opening the service to the public. In the fall of 2012, WeoGeo became more focused on marketplace offerings.

== Products and services ==
WeoGeo's main product is the WeoGeo Market. It can handle millions of individual geo-content files and maps, ranging in file size from megabytes to terabytes. It is an internet B2B marketplace that enables geospatial professionals to search, discover, customize, and acquire professional geo-content within minutes of entry to the marketplace.

== Location ==
WeoGeo was located in Portland, OR at the Portland State Business Accelerator until acquired by Trimble.

== Closure ==
In 2018 Trimble shut down Trimble Data Marketplace, directing users to other services.
