= Cooperative Institute for Great Lakes Research =

Organization in Michigan, US

Coordinates: 42.27697°N 83.734679°W

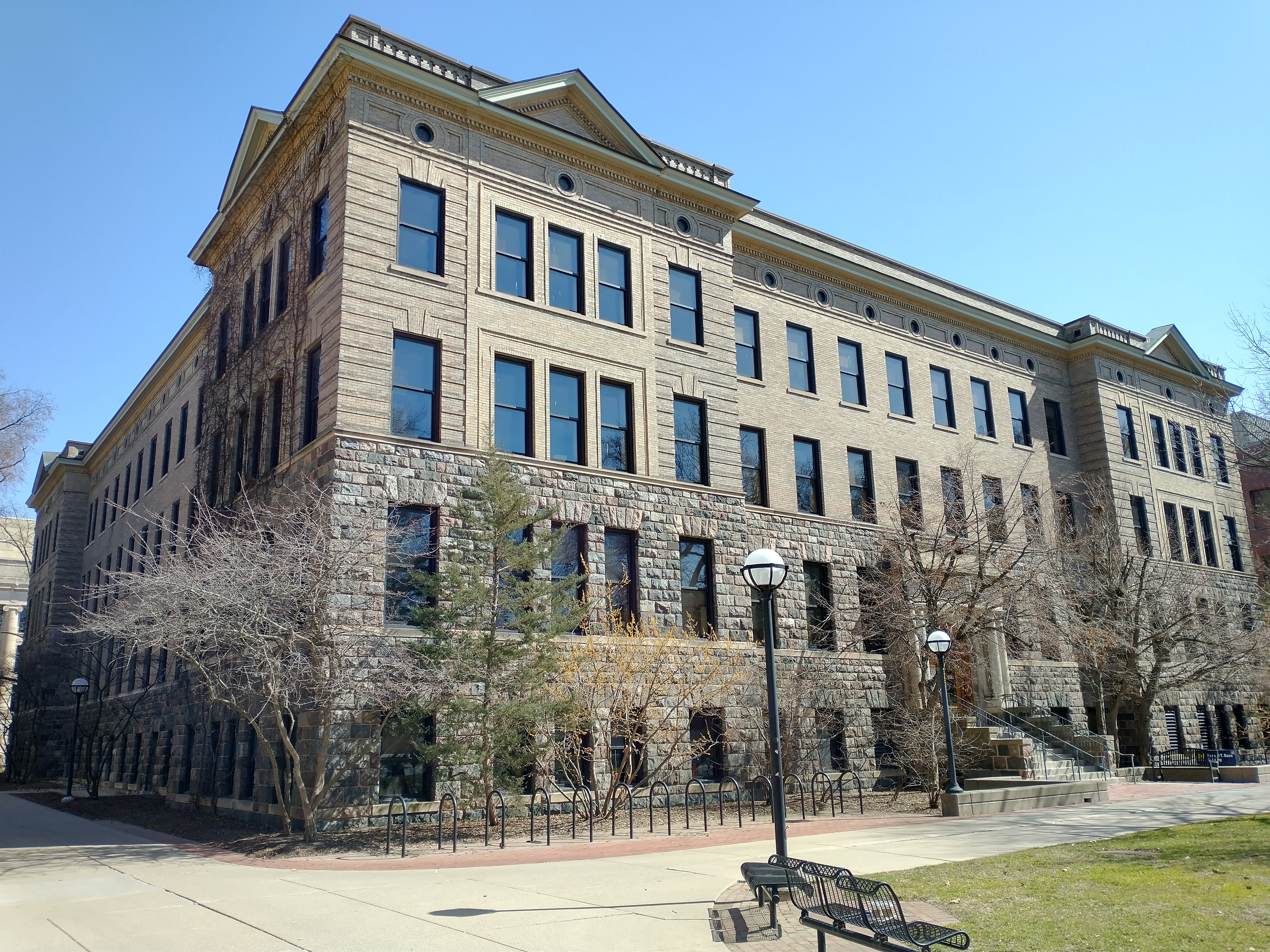
The Dana building at the University of Michigan, where the Institute has been hosted

The Cooperative Institute for Great Lakes Research, formerly known as the Cooperative Institute for Limnology and Ecosystems Research, fosters research collaborations between the National Oceanic and Atmospheric Administration (NOAA) Office of Oceanic and Atmospheric Research (OAR) Great Lakes Environmental Research Laboratory (GLERL), Michigan State University (MSU), and the University of Michigan (UM). It is one of 16 NOAA Cooperative Institutes (CIs).

The 7th Director in the 32-year history of CIGLR from October 22, 2021 is PhD Gregory J. Dick, Professor in the Department of Earth and Environmental Sciences in the College of Literature, Science, and the Arts (LSA) at the University of Michigan.

The CILER research themes are:

- Climate and Large Lake Dynamics
- Coastal and Nearshore Processes
- Large Lake Ecosystem Structure and Function
- Remote Sensing of Large Lake and Coastal Ocean Dynamics
- Marine Environmental Engineering
