= Great Lakes Environmental Research Laboratory =

US Climate Change organization

Great Lakes Environmental Research Laboratory logo.

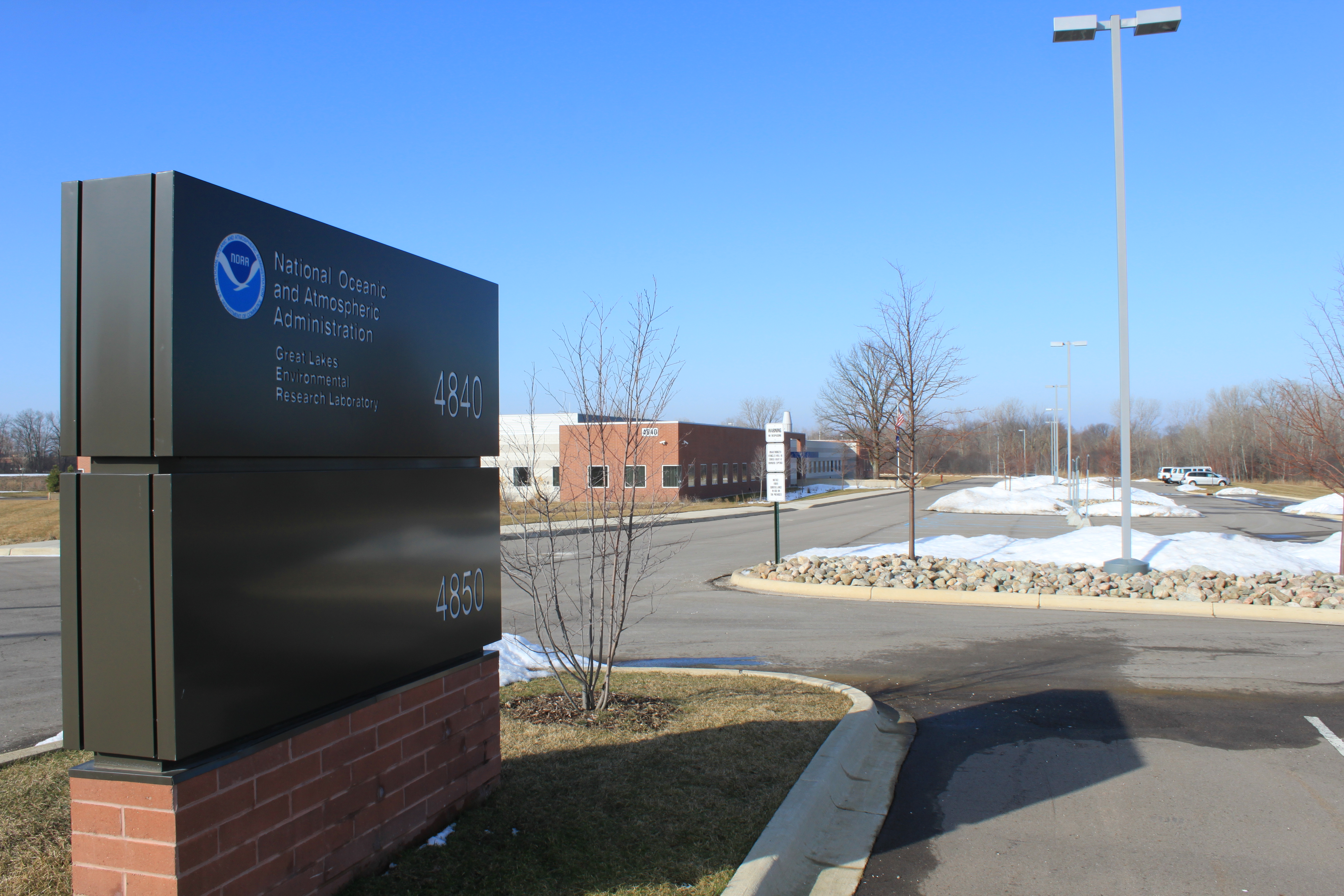
Great Lakes Environmental Laboratory

The Great Lakes Environmental Research Laboratory (GLERL) is a laboratory in the National Oceanic and Atmospheric Administration (NOAA) Office of Oceanic and Atmospheric Research (OAR). It is headquartered in Ann Arbor, Michigan, with a subsidiary field station in Muskegon, Michigan.

GLERL is a multidisciplinary environmental research laboratory that provides scientific understanding to inform the use and management of Great Lakes and coastal marine environments. It is one of seven NOAA Research Laboratories (RLs).

== History ==
GLERL was created 25 April 1974 when NOAA merged part of the pre-existing Lake Survey Center (the Limnology and Computer Divisions) with the staff of the International Field Year of the Great Lakes (IFYGL) office. IFYGL had taken place the previous year 1972–1973. The first director was Eugene Aubert (1974-1986).

In February 2025 the GLERL communication services was forced to go on an "indefinite Hiatus" due to 20% of the staff being fired by the Office of Personnel Management.

== Awards ==
- The Huron Explorer, a 41-foot (13 m) former U.S. Coast Guard vessel, was refurbished to use vegetable based fuels and lubricants rather than petroleum based. The Department of Energy gave an award to NOAA for the vessel as part of the Federal Energy Management Program.
