= Florida Environmental Research Institute =

Nonprofit research and education organization

Florida Environmental Research Institute (FERI)
- Type: Not-for-profit Research Institute
- Founded: 1998
- Founder: W. Paul Bissett
- Headquarters: Tampa, FL, USA
- Website: FERI's Home Page

The Florida Environmental Research Institute (FERI) is a 501(c)3 not-for-profit, research and education organization located in Tampa, Florida. Founded in 1998, FERI’s initial client was the Department of Defense (DoD) Office of Naval Research (ONR). It was ONR's funding that allowed for the development of the tools to rapidly assess the coastal ocean environment utilizing cutting edge environmental mapping and monitoring techniques, specifically hyperspectral remote sensing. Currently, FERI is responsible for a wide range of tasks spanning from the construction and aerial deployment of several digital sensor systems to the analysis of the data generated by these systems to produce informative and functional maps of U.S. coastal regions.

In 2003 the institute received part of a $4.2 million National Science Foundation grant for a study of pollution in the Hudson River.

In the Fall of 2006, FERI spun off a for profit project focused on the development of an online mapping portal called WeoGeo.
