= RCP9 =

Protein-coding gene in the species Homo sapiens

CRCP

Identifiers
- Aliases: CRCP, CGRP-RCP, CGRPRCP, RCP, RCP9, CGRP receptor component, RPC9, POLR3I, POLR3J, C17
- External IDs: OMIM: 606121; MGI: 1100818; GeneCards: CRCP

Gene location (Human)
Chr.	Chromosome 7 (human)
Band	7q11.21	Start	66,114,604 bp
Band	7q11.21	End	66,154,568 bp

Gene location (Mouse)
Chr.	Chromosome 5 (mouse)
Band	5|5 G1.3	Start	130,058,131 bp
Band	5|5 G1.3	End	130,089,630 bp
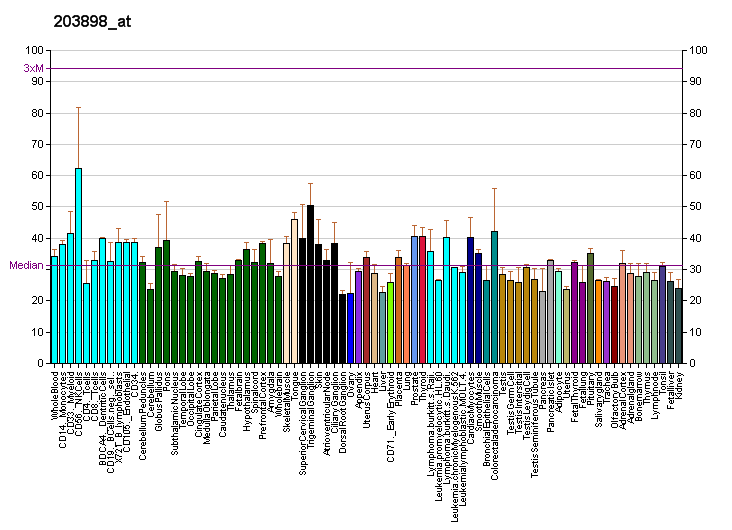

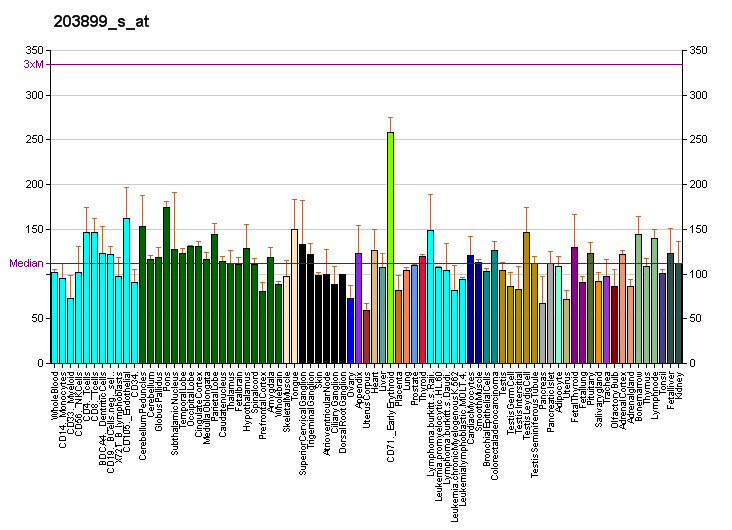
RNA expression pattern
Bgee	Human / Mouse (ortholog); Top expressed in: Achilles tendon; ganglionic eminence; islet of Langerhans; right lobe of liver; monocyte; oocyte; rectum; amniotic fluid; stromal cell of endometrium; prefrontal cortex / Top expressed in: dentate gyrus of hippocampal formation granule cell; spermatocyte; barrel cortex; motor neuron; Paneth cell; endothelial cell of lymphatic vessel; lens; trigeminal ganglion; seminiferous tubule; morula; More reference expression data
BioGPS	More reference expression data
Gene ontology
Molecular function	nucleotide binding; RNA polymerase III activity; DNA-directed 5'-3' RNA polymerase activity; protein binding; catalytic activity; calcitonin gene-related peptide receptor activity
Cellular component	cytosol; membrane; plasma membrane; nucleoplasm; acrosomal vesicle; DNA polymerase III complex; nucleus; RNA polymerase III complex; nuclear DNA-directed RNA polymerase complex; RNA polymerase complex
Biological process	immune system process; cell metabolism; defense response to virus; neuropeptide signaling pathway; transcription by RNA polymerase III; innate immune response; DNA-templated transcription, initiation; transcription initiation from RNA polymerase III promoter; positive regulation of type I interferon production
Sources:Amigo / QuickGO
Orthologs
Databases	NCBI: entry; OMA: entry
Species	Human	Mouse
Entrez	27297	12909
Ensembl	ENSG00000241258	ENSMUSG00000025532
UniProt	O75575	O35427
RefSeq (mRNA)	NM_001040647; NM_001040648; NM_001142414; NM_014478	NM_007761
RefSeq (protein)	NP_001035737; NP_001035738; NP_001135886; NP_055293	NP_031787
Location (UCSC)	Chr 7: 66.11 – 66.15 Mb	Chr 5: 130.06 – 130.09 Mb
PubMed search
- Wikidata
View/Edit Human	View/Edit Mouse

DNA-directed RNA polymerase III subunit RPC9 is an enzyme that in humans is encoded by the CRCP gene.

This gene encodes a membrane protein that functions as part of a receptor complex for a small neuropeptide that increases intracellular cAMP levels. Alternate transcriptional splice variants, encoding different isoforms, have been characterized.
