= Consumer Rights Commission of Pakistan =

Consumer Rights Commission of Pakistan (Urdu: ماموریہ برائے حقوق صارفین پاکستان), (CRCP) is a rights-based civil initiative registered under the Trust Act, 1882. Established in 1998, CRCP is an independent, non-profit, and non-governmental organization. It largely works through local fund-raising and engaging volunteers. It is not supported by any industry or commercial sector. It is the first national consumer organization in the country, which approaches the issue of consumer protection in comprehensive and holistic terms. Its vision and strategies have significant cross linkages with both market practices and issues of governance.
