= McMaster Institute of Environment and Health =

Special program at McMaster University

Coordinates: 43.26187°N 79.92027°W

- Established: 1996
- Director: Bruce Newbold
- Location: Hamilton, ON, Canada
- Website: http://www.mcmaster.ca/mieh/

The McMaster Institute of Environment and Health (MIEH), established in 1996, is a special program at McMaster University. The goal of MIEH is to facilitate, promote, and publish environmental health research. Research and study the complex relationships between the environment and human health.
