= Office of Oceanic and Atmospheric Research =

NOAA environmental products and services

Oceanic and Atmospheric Research
- National Oceanic and Atmospheric Administration seal

Agency overview
- Formed: 1841; 185 years ago
- Headquarters: Silver Spring, Maryland, U.S.
- Motto: OAR's Vision is to deliver NOAA's future. OAR's Mission is to conduct research to understand and predict the Earth's oceans, weather and climate, to advance NOAA science, service and stewardship and transition the results so they are useful to society.
- Agency executives: Craig McLean, Assistant Administrator; Ko Barrett, Deputy Assistant Administrator for Programs and Administration; Dr. Gary Matlock, Acting Deputy Assistant Administrator for Laboratories and Cooperative Institutes
- Website: research.noaa.gov

Oceanic and Atmospheric Research (OAR) is a division of the National Oceanic and Atmospheric Administration (NOAA). OAR is also referred to as NOAA Research.

NOAA Research is the research and development arm of NOAA and is the driving force behind NOAA environmental products and services aimed at protecting life and property and promoting sustainable economic growth. Research, conducted by programs within NOAA and through collaborations outside NOAA, focuses on enhancing the understanding of environmental phenomena such as tornadoes, hurricanes, climate variability, changes in the ozone layer, El Niño/La Niña events, fisheries productivity, ocean currents, deep sea thermal vents, and coastal ecosystem health.

The origins of NOAA Research date to the creation of the Survey of the Coast (renamed the United States Coast Survey in 1836 and the United States Coast and Geodetic Survey in 1878) by President Thomas Jefferson in 1807 and to the creation in 1841 of the United States Lake Survey. The Coast Survey was created to conduct hydrographic surveys of the coastline of the United States, while the Lake Survey was created to undertake "a hydrographic survey of northwestern lakes," i.e., the Great Lakes. Research executed by the scientists of the Lake Survey was innovative and holistic: the first current meters were developed to understand water flow rates, and forecasting techniques were greatly enhanced to predict water levels and the relationship to lakefront property.

The science and technology that NOAA Research produces is not only relevant to society, it anticipates and responds to partners' needs to demonstrates the value of technologies so that partners can deploy them into their applications. OAR works with end-users to integrate mature technologies (and associated expertise) into larger systems, either in NOAA operations or partner applications, via testbeds, patents, etc.

== Organization ==
NOAA Research is an open research network consisting of seven federal research laboratories, six program offices, sixteen Cooperative Institutes (which are non-federal, non-profit research institutions in five-to-ten-year collaborative partnerships with NOAA), and 33 university-based Sea Grant programs. OAR also relies on work performed at numerous public, private, and academic institutions.

Weather Program Office includes the Earth Prediction Innovation Center, created by the United States Congress in 2018 to improve collaboration with academia and private companies.

In April 2025, under the second presidency of Donald Trump, a draft budget proposal indicated intent to "eliminate all funding for climate, weather, and ocean laboratories and cooperative institutes," which would include the closure of the Office of Oceanic and Atmospheric Research as a NOAA line office.

== Research activities ==
NOAA Research has three primary research areas: Climate; Weather and Air Chemistry; and Ocean, Coasts, and the Great Lakes. Both in-house and external scientists:

- Continue to conduct experiments to understand natural processes (physical, geochemical, ecological)
- Build predictive models for use in weather, climate, solar, ocean, and coastal assessments and predictions.
- Develop and deploy new observing technologies to provide data to support predictive models and to document natural variability.
- Develop new analytical and forecast tools to improve weather services and earlier warnings for natural disasters.
- Use new information technology to share information with other federal and academic scientists.
- Prepare scientific assessments and information products to enhance public education and guide governmental action.

Research plans and products are developed in partnership with academia and other federal agencies, and are peer-reviewed and widely distributed.

=== Climate Research ===
NOAA's research laboratories, Climate Program Office, and research partners conduct research into complex climate systems and how they work. The aim of this research is to predict climate variation in the shorter term, for example, cold spells or periods of drought, and over longer terms, such as centuries and beyond.

NOAA scientists are at the forefront of studying climate change and modeling what the effects will be on the Earth. Researchers at NOAA's Great Lakes Environmental Research Laboratory (GLERL) have developed the Coupled Hydrosphere-Atmosphere Research Model (CHARM) to enable a valid assessment of the impact of how climate change might affect the climate and ecology of the Great Lakes. The CHARM model provides a realistic surface-atmosphere feedback portrayal, and accounts for runoff from land surfaces. It allows researchers to predict that global warming likely will bring higher temperatures and increased precipitation to the Great Lakes. Development of a second generation of CHARM is underway to help answer questions about greenhouse warming effects on Great Lakes water quantity.

NOAA researchers closely monitor the Earth's atmosphere searching for clues about long-term changes in the global climate. The data collected worldwide by NOAA researchers contributes to the understanding of complex climatic systems and the ability to forecast changes.

=== Weather and Air Chemistry Research ===
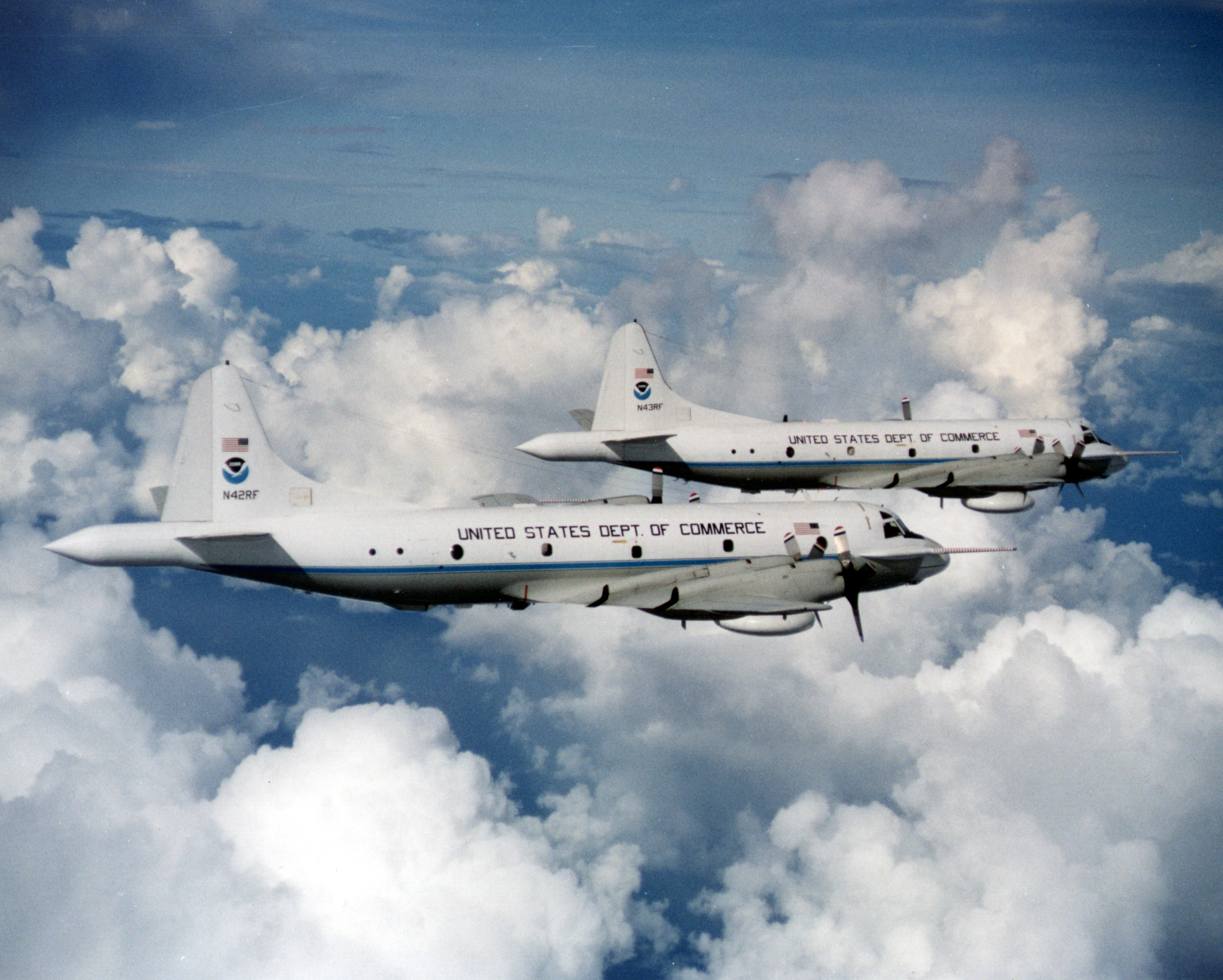
Two NOAA WP-3D hurricane hunter aircraft

NOAA Research organizations conduct research on the upper and lower atmosphere as well as the space environment. Their findings form the basis for NOAA's contributions to major national and international environmental programs and agreements.

For instance, improvements in forecast and warning services provided by the National Weather Service are a direct result of NOAA research. Improvements in numerical modeling, observations gathered by satellites and Doppler weather radars (NEXRAD), and sophisticated weather warning and information processing and communications systems, have collectively led to significantly improved severe weather forecasts and warnings.

Other research programs focus on observation and study of the chemical and physical processes of the atmosphere, detecting the effects of pollution on those processes and monitoring and forecasting the phenomena affecting the Sun-Earth environment.

=== Ocean, Coasts & the Great Lakes Research ===
NOAA Research, in cooperation with its research partners, explores and investigates ocean habitats and resources. The findings of NOAA researchers contribute to the management of fisheries, conservation of coastlines, and development of a stronger economy through marine products and businesses, such as biotechnology and sustainable aquaculture.

NOAA's Pacific Marine Environmental Laboratory (PMEL) in Seattle, Washington, designed Deep-ocean Assessment and Reporting of Tsunamis (DART-II) technology, which provides two-way communication capabilities, allowing engineers the ability to troubleshoot these systems from the lab and repair them remotely when possible. This capability minimizes system downtime, especially in the harsh winter conditions of the North Pacific Ocean, and reduces costs by not having to deploy a ship to make repairs.

== Goals ==
NOAA research is intended to:

- Provide comprehensive knowledge to guide national environmental policy decisions, including better predictions of the climate response to emissions changes, choices for protection of the ozone layer, and alternatives for developing coastal communities
- Improve environmental services to the nation, including reliable predictions and assessments
- Promote economic growth through science for decision-making, new technology, and partnerships with academia and industry

== Laboratories ==
The laboratories that are part of NOAA Research are located throughout the United States near their areas of focus. These include:

- Atlantic Oceanographic and Meteorological Laboratory (AOML) - Miami, FL
- Air Resources Laboratory (ARL) - Silver Spring, MD
- Earth System Research Laboratories (ESRL) - Boulder, CO
- Geophysical Fluid Dynamics Laboratory (GFDL) - Princeton, NJ
- Great Lakes Environmental Research Laboratory (GLERL) - Ann Arbor, MI
- National Severe Storms Laboratory (NSSL) - Norman, OK
- Pacific Marine Environmental Laboratory (PMEL) - Seattle, WA and Newport, OR

The NOAA Research Laboratories conduct an integrated program of research, technology development, and services to improve the understanding of Earth's atmosphere, oceans and inland waters, and to describe and predict changes occurring to them. The laboratories and their field stations are located across the country and around the world.

The laboratories have established formal collaborative agreements with universities/non-profit research institutions to form joint research institutes pertaining to the Earth's oceans, inland waters, intermountain west, atmosphere, and arctic environment.

Scientific reviews are conducted every five years to evaluate the quality, relevance, and performance of research conducted at the OAR laboratories. These reviews help to strategically position laboratories in their planning of future science and are intended to ensure that OAR laboratory research is linked to the NOAA Next Generation Strategic Plan, remains relevant to the NOAA research mission and its priorities, and is consistent with NOAA planning, programming, and budgeting processes.

== Joint Institute research partners ==
NOAA Research partners with research-oriented universities and institutions to share data and resources to advance the goals of NOAA.

- Cooperative Institute for Climate Science (CICS-P) - Princeton, NJ
- Cooperative Institute for Climate and Satellites (CICS-M) - College Park, MD
- Cooperative Institute for Arctic Research (CIFAR) - Fairbanks, AK
- Cooperative Institute for Limnology and Ecosystems Research (CILER) - Ann Arbor, MI
- Cooperative Institute for Marine and Atmospheric Studies (CIMAS) - Miami, FL
- Cooperative Institute for Marine Ecosystems and Climate (CIMEC) - La Jolla, CA
- Cooperative Institute for Severe and High-Impact Weather Research and Operations (CIWRO) - Norman, OK
- Cooperative Institute for Marine Resources Studies (CIMRS) - Newport, OR
- Cooperative Institute for Meteorological Satellite Studies (CIMSS) - Madison, WI
- Cooperative Institute for the North Atlantic Region (CINAR) - Woods Hole, MA
- Cooperative Institute for Ocean Exploration, Research, and Technology (CIOERT) - Fort Pierce, FL
- Cooperative Institute for Research in the Atmosphere (CIRA) - Fort Collins, CO
- Cooperative Institute for Research in Environmental Sciences (CIRES) - Boulder, CO
- Joint Institute for Marine and Atmospheric Research (CIPIR/JIMAR) - Honolulu, HI
- Joint Institute for the Study of the Atmosphere and Ocean (JISAO) - Seattle, Washington
- Northern Gulf Institute (NGI) - Stennis Space Center, MS
