= Cooperative Institute for Climate Science =

Climatological research organization

Coordinates: 40.34954°N 74.61774°W

The Cooperative Institute for Climate Science (CICS) fosters research collaborations between the National Oceanic and Atmospheric Administration (NOAA)/Office of Oceanic and Atmospheric Research (OAR) Geophysical Fluid Dynamics Laboratory (GFDL) and the Princeton University.It is one of 16 NOAA Cooperative Institutes (CIs).

The CICS research themes are:

- Earth system studies
- Biogeochemistry
- Coastal processes
- Paleoclimate
