= National Oceanic and Atmospheric Administration =

US government scientific agency

- Flag of NOAA

Agency overview
- Formed: October 3, 1970; 56 years ago
- Preceding agencies: United States Coast and Geodetic Survey; Environmental Science Services Administration
- Jurisdiction: Federal government of the United States
- Headquarters: Silver Spring, Maryland; 38°59′32″N 77°01′50″W
- Employees: 321 NOAA Commissioned Corps (2018); 12,000 civilian employees (2021)
- Annual budget: $6.9 billion (est. 2022)
- Agency executive: Neil Jacobs, NOAA Administrator and Under Secretary of Commerce for Oceans and Atmosphere
- Parent agency: US Department of Commerce
- Child agencies: National Environmental Satellite, Data, and Information Service; National Marine Fisheries Service; National Ocean Service; National Weather Service; Office of Marine and Aviation Operations; Office of Oceanic and Atmospheric Research; Office of Space Commerce
- Website: www.noaa.gov

The National Oceanic and Atmospheric Administration (NOAA /ˈnoʊ.ə/ NOH-ə) is a United States scientific and regulatory agency tasked with forecasting weather, monitoring oceanic and atmospheric conditions, charting the seas, conducting deep-sea exploration, and managing fishing and protection of marine mammals and endangered species in the US exclusive economic zone. The agency is part of the United States Department of Commerce and is headquartered in Silver Spring, Maryland.

== History ==
=== Founding ===
NOAA traces its history back to multiple agencies, some of which are among the earliest in the federal government:

- United States Coast and Geodetic Survey, formed in 1807
- Weather Bureau of the United States, formed in 1870
- Bureau of Commercial Fisheries, formed in 1871 (research fleet only)
- Coast and Geodetic Survey Corps, formed in 1917

=== 20th century ===
The most direct predecessor of NOAA was the Environmental Science Services Administration (ESSA), into which several existing scientific agencies such as the United States Coast and Geodetic Survey, the Weather Bureau, and the uniformed Corps were absorbed in 1965.

NOAA was established within the Department of Commerce via the Reorganization Plan No. 4, and formed on October 3, 1970, after U.S. President Richard Nixon proposed creating a new agency to serve a national need for "better protection of life and property from natural hazards... for a better understanding of the total environment... [and] for exploration and development leading to the intelligent use of our marine resources".

NOAA is a part of the Department of Commerce rather than the Department of Interior, because of a feud between President Nixon and his interior secretary, Wally Hickel, over the Nixon Administration's Vietnam War policy. Nixon did not like Hickel's letter urging Nixon to listen to the Vietnam War demonstrators, and punished Hickel by not putting NOAA in the Interior Department.

=== 21st century ===
In 2007, NOAA celebrated 200 years of service in its role as successor to the U.S. Survey of the Coast.

In 2021, NOAA had 11,833 civilian employees. Its research and operations are further supported by 321 uniformed service members, who made up the NOAA Commissioned Corps.

In 2024, Project 2025 proposed to get rid of the Office of Oceanic and Atmospheric Research, which would "dismantle" NOAA's research division.

NOAA has experienced numerous changes under the second presidency of Donald Trump. On February 27, 2025, several hundred NOAA staffers, mainly probationary, were laid off after staffers from the Department of Government Efficiency (DOGE) entered the headquarters of NOAA. By early March, 1,300 NOAA staff members (roughly 10% of the total workforce) were laid off.

In June, 2025, the Department of Defense announced it would no longer provide critical weather data to scientists and forecasters, including to NOAA staff.

== Organizational structure ==
=== Silver Spring Campus ===
Since 1993, NOAA's administrative headquarters has been located at the Silver Spring Metro Center office complex in downtown Silver Spring, Maryland. The consolidated 1.2 million sq ft (110,000 m^{2}), four-building campus was constructed in 1993 and is home to over 40 NOAA sub-agencies and offices, including the National Weather Service.

=== Administrator ===
Neil Jacobs was confirmed as Under Secretary for Oceans and Atmosphere and NOAA Administrator on Oct 7th, 2025 and he took over shortly thereafter. Prior to that, NOAA Chief of Staff Laura Grimm had been the Acting Under Secretary since March 31, 2025 and prior to that Nancy Hann had held this role following the change of administrations on January 20, 2025 when Rick Spinrad resigned.

Neil Jacobs, then Assistant Secretary of Commerce for Environmental Observation and Prediction, served as acting Under Secretary of Commerce for Oceans and Atmosphere at the US Department of Commerce and as NOAA's interim administrator from February 25, 2019, to January 20, 2021 during the first Trump Administration. Jacobs succeeded Timothy Gallaudet, who succeeded Benjamin Friedman. The three served in series as NOAA's interim administrator throughout the first Trump Administration.

=== Independent agency proposal ===
NOAA was created by an executive order in 1970 and has never been established in law, despite its critical role. In January 2023, The Washington Post reported that Congressman Frank Lucas, the new chair of the House Science, Space and Technology Committee, had released draft legislation to make NOAA an independent agency, rather than it being part of the Commerce Department. Lucas' push was in response to Republican leaders who had signaled plans to slash funding for agencies and programs that continued to receive annual appropriations, but had not been reauthorized by Congress. "It's been made quite clear in the Republican conference that my friends don't want to fund programs that are not properly authorized," said Lucas. "NOAA is very important, so we need to get it authorized."

=== Services ===
NOAA works toward its mission through six major line offices: the National Environmental Satellite, Data, and Information Service (NESDIS), the National Marine Fisheries Service (NMFS), the National Ocean Service (NOS), the National Weather Service (NWS), the Office of Oceanic and Atmospheric Research (OAR) and the Office of Marine and Aviation Operations (OMAO). NOAA has more than a dozen staff offices, including the Office of the Federal Coordinator for Meteorology, the NOAA Central Library, the Office of Program Planning and Integration (PPI).

==== National Weather Service ====
The National Weather Service (NWS) is tasked with providing "weather, hydrologic and climate forecasts and warnings for the United States, its territories, adjacent waters and ocean areas, for the protection of life and property and the enhancement of the national economy", according to NOAA. This is done through a collection of national and regional centers, 13 river forecast centers (RFCs), and more than 120 local weather forecast offices (WFOs). They are charged with issuing weather and river forecasts, advisories, watches, and warnings on a daily basis. They issue more than 734,000 weather and 850,000 river forecasts, and more than 45,000 severe weather warnings annually. NOAA data is also relevant to the issues of climate change and ozone depletion.

The NWS operates NEXRAD, a nationwide network of Doppler weather radars which can detect precipitation and their velocities. Many of their products are broadcast on NOAA Weather Radio, a network of radio transmitters that broadcasts weather forecasts, severe weather statements, watches and warnings 24 hours a day.

==== National Ocean Service ====
The National Ocean Service (NOS) focuses on ensuring that ocean and coastal areas are safe, healthy, and productive. NOS scientists, natural resource managers, and specialists serve America by ensuring safe and efficient marine transportation, promoting innovative solutions to protect coastal communities, and conserving marine and coastal places.

The National Ocean Service is composed of eight program offices: the Center for Operational Oceanographic Products and Services, the Office for Coastal Management, the National Centers for Coastal Ocean Science, the Office of Coast Survey, the Office of National Geodetic Survey, the Office of National Marine Sanctuaries, the Office of Ocean and Coastal Resource Management, and the Office of Response and Restoration.

There are two NOS programs, the Mussel Watch Contaminant Monitoring Program and the NOAA Integrated Ocean Observing System (IOOS). There are two staff offices, the International Program Office and the Management and Budget Office.

==== National Environmental Satellite, Data, and Information Service ====
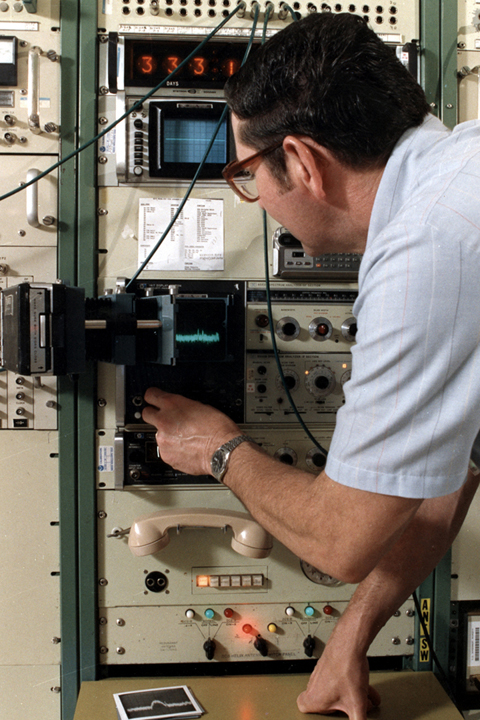
A NOAA engineer at work

The National Environmental Satellite, Data, and Information Service (NESDIS) was created by NOAA to operate and manage the US environmental satellite programs, and manage NWS data and those of other government agencies and departments. NESDIS's National Centers for Environmental Information (NCEI) archives data collected by the NOAA, United States Navy, United States Air Force, the Federal Aviation Administration, and meteorological services around the world. It comprises the Center for Weather and Climate, previously NOAA's National Climatic Data Center, the National Coastal Data Development Center (NCDDC), the National Oceanographic Data Center (NODC), and the National Geophysical Data Center (NGDC)).

In 1960, TIROS-1, NASA's first owned and operated geostationary satellite, was launched. Since 1966, NESDIS has managed polar orbiting satellites (POES). Since 1974, it has operated geosynchronous satellites (GOES). In 1979, NOAA's first polar-orbiting environmental satellite was launched. Current operational satellites include NOAA-15, NOAA-18, NOAA-19, GOES 13, GOES 14, GOES 15, Jason-2, DSCOVR and SWO-F1. In 1983, NOAA assumed operational responsibility for the Landsat satellite system.

Since May 1998, NESDIS has operated the Defense Meteorological Satellite Program (DMSP) satellites on behalf of the Air Force Weather Agency.

New generations of satellites are developed to succeed the current polar orbiting and geosynchronous satellites, the Joint Polar Satellite System, and GOES-R, which launched in November 2016.

NESDIS runs the Office of Projects, Planning, and Analysis (OPPA) formerly the Office of Systems Development, the Office of Satellite Ground Systems (formerly the Office of Satellite Operations) the Office of Satellite and Project Operations, the Center for Satellite Applications and Research (STAR)], the Joint Polar Satellite System Program Office the GOES-R Program Office, the International & Interagency Affairs Office, the Office of Space Commerce and the Office of System Architecture and Advanced Planning.

==== National Marine Fisheries Service ====
The National Marine Fisheries Service (NMFS), also known as NOAA Fisheries, was initiated in 1871 with a primary goal of the research, protection, management, and restoration of commercial and recreational fisheries and their habitat, and protected species. The NMFS operates twelve headquarters offices, five regional offices, six fisheries science centers, and more than 20 laboratories throughout the United States and U.S. territories, which are the sites of research and management of marine resources. The NMFS operates the National Oceanic and Atmospheric Administration Fisheries Office of Law Enforcement in Silver Spring, Maryland, which is the primary site of marine resource law enforcement.

==== Office of Oceanic and Atmospheric Research ====
NOAA's research, conducted through the Office of Oceanic and Atmospheric Research (OAR), is the driving force behind NOAA environmental products and services that protect life and property and promote economic growth. Research, conducted in OAR laboratories and by extramural programs, focuses on enhancing our understanding of environmental phenomena such as tornadoes, hurricanes, climate variability, solar flares, changes in the ozone, air pollution transport and dispersion, El Niño/La Niña events, fisheries productivity, ocean currents, deep sea thermal vents, and coastal ecosystem health. NOAA research also develops innovative technologies and observing systems.

The NOAA Research network consists of seven internal research laboratories, extramural research at 30 Sea Grant university and research programs, six undersea research centers, a research grants program through the Climate Program Office, and 13 cooperative institutes with academia. NOAA and its academic partners are used by scientists, engineers, technicians, and graduate students.

The Air Resources Laboratory (ARL) is one of the laboratories in the Office of Oceanic and Atmospheric Research. It studies processes and develops models relating to climate and air quality, including the transport, dispersion, transformation and removal of pollutants from the ambient atmosphere. The emphasis of the ARL's work is on data interpretation, technology development and transfer. The specific goal of ARL research is to improve and eventually to institutionalize prediction of trends, dispersion of air pollutant plumes, air quality, atmospheric deposition, and related variables.

The Atlantic Oceanographic and Meteorological Laboratory (AOML), is part of NOAA's Office of Oceanic and Atmospheric Research, located in Miami, Florida. AOML's research spans hurricanes, coastal ecosystems, oceans, and human health, climate studies, global carbon systems, and ocean observations. AOML's organizational structure consists of an Office of the Director and three scientific research divisions, Physical Oceanography, Ocean Chemistry and Ecosystems, and Hurricane Research. The Office of the Director oversees the Laboratory's scientific programs, as well as its financial, administrative, computer, outreach/education, and facility management services.

Research programs are augmented by the Cooperative Institute for Marine and Atmospheric Studies (CIMAS), a joint enterprise with the University of Miami's Rosenstiel School of Marine and Atmospheric Science. CIMAS enables AOML and university scientists to collaborate on research areas of mutual interest and facilitates the participation of students and visiting scientists. AOML is a member of a unique community of marine research and educational institutions located on Virginia Key in Miami, Florida.

In 1977, the Pacific Marine Environmental Laboratory (PMEL) deployed the first successful moored equatorial current meter – the beginning of the Tropical Atmosphere Ocean, TAO, array. In 1984, the Tropical Ocean-Global Atmosphere program (TOGA) program began.

The Arctic Report Card is the annual update charts of the ongoing impact of changing conditions on the environment and community by NOAA. In 2019, it was compiled by 81 scientists from 12 nations.

==== Office of Marine and Aviation Operations ====
The Office of Marine and Aviation Operations is responsible for the fleet of NOAA ships, aircraft, and diving operations. It is the largest research fleet in the Federal government. Its personnel is made up of federal civil service employees and NOAA Corps Commissioned Officers. The office is led by a NOAA Corps two-star Rear Admiral, who also commands the NOAA Corps.

==== National Geodetic Survey ====
The National Geodetic Survey (NGS) is a major surveying organization in the United States.

==== National Integrated Drought Information System ====
The National Integrated Drought Information System is a program within NOAA with an interagency mandate to coordinate and integrate drought research, building upon existing federal, tribal, state, and local partnerships in support of creating a national drought early warning information system.

==== NOAA Commissioned Officer Corps ====
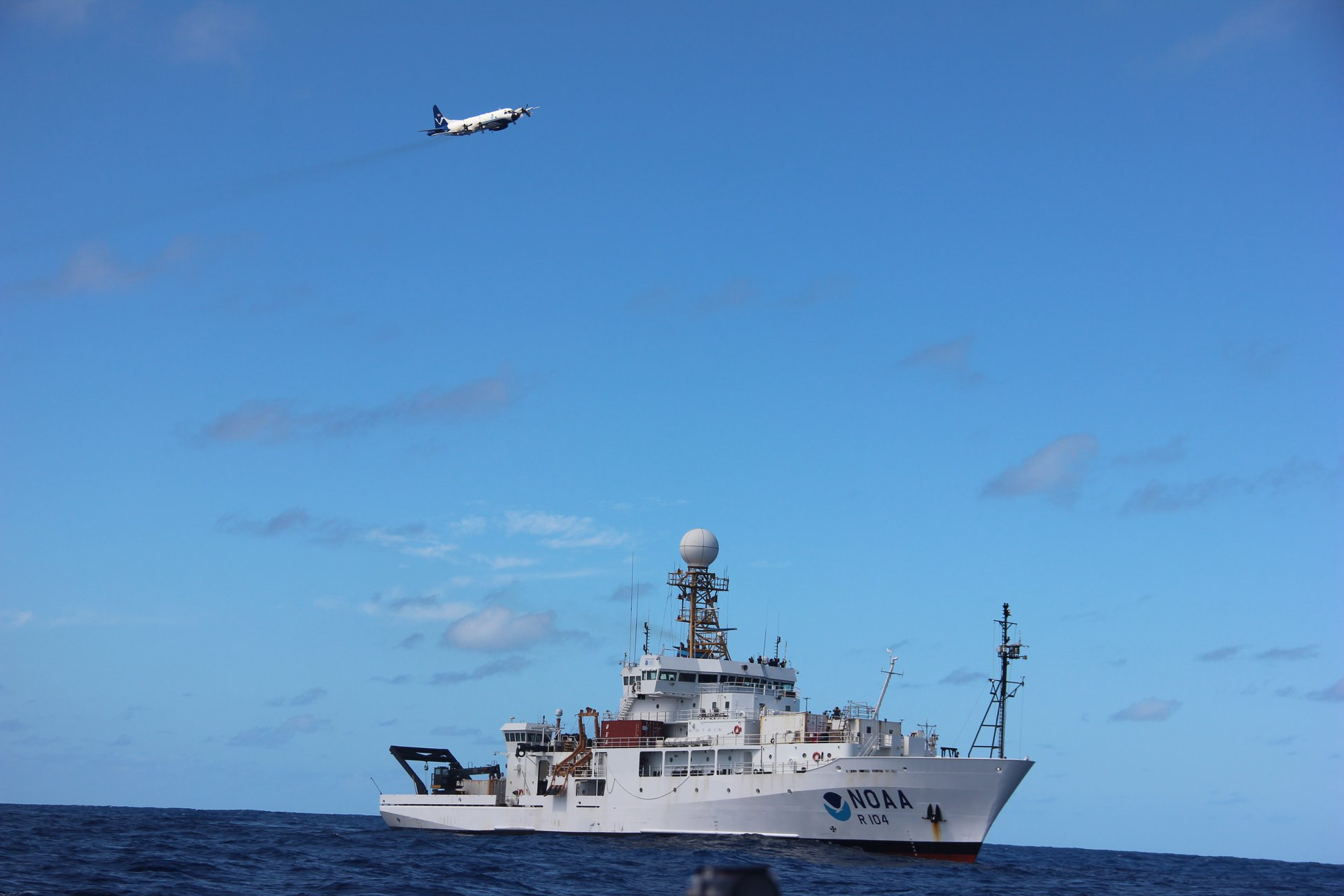
A WP-3D Orion of the NOAA Hurricane Hunters flies over NOAAS Ronald H. Brown.

The NOAA Commissioned Officer Corps is a uniformed service of men and women who operate NOAA ships and aircraft, and serve in scientific and administrative posts.

=== List of agencies and programs ===
- National Environmental Satellite, Data, and Information Service (NESDIS)
  - National Climatic Data Center (NCDC); Dissolved In 2015
  - National Centers for Environmental Information (NCEI)
- National Marine Fisheries Service (NMFS or NOAA Fisheries)
  - NOAA Fisheries Office of Law Enforcement (NOAA OLE)
  - Seafood Inspection Program
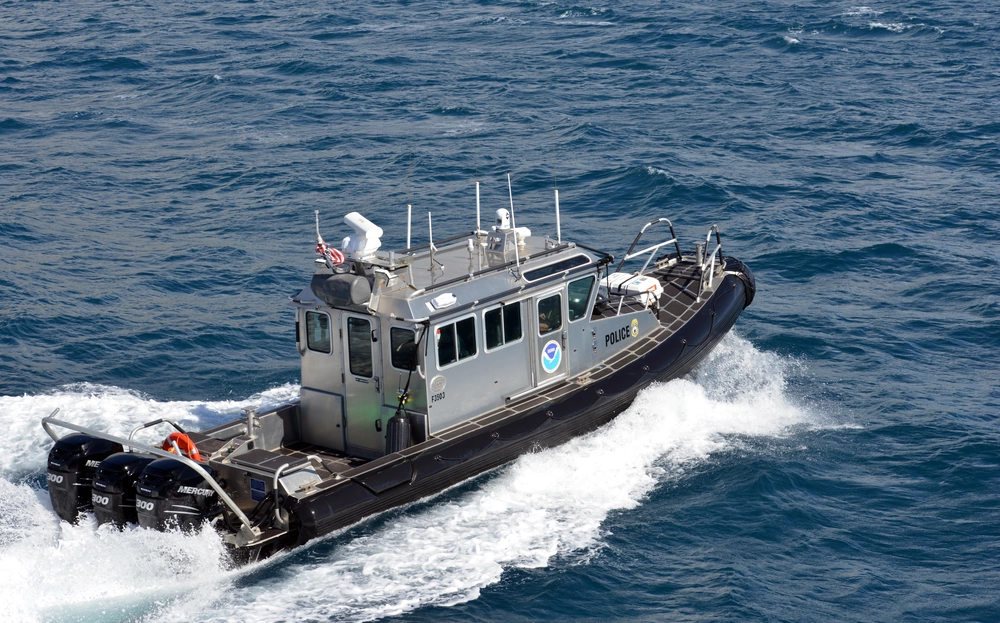
    - NOAA patrol boat supports whale protection off Maui during Operation Kohola Guardian.
      Central Florida Lot Seafood Inspection Office (CFLSIO)
  - Pacific Islands Regional Office
  - Pacific Islands Fisheries Science Center (PIFSC)
  - Human Capital Management Office (NMFS HCMO)
- National Ocean Service (NOS)
  - Center for Operational Oceanographic Products and Services (CO-OPS)
  - National Centers for Coastal Ocean Science (NCCOS)
  - Office of Coast Survey (OCS)
  - Office for Coastal Management (OCM)
  - National Geodetic Survey (NGS)
  - Office of National Marine Sanctuaries (ONMS)
    - Monitor National Marine Sanctuary (MNMS)
  - Office of Response and Restoration (OR&R)
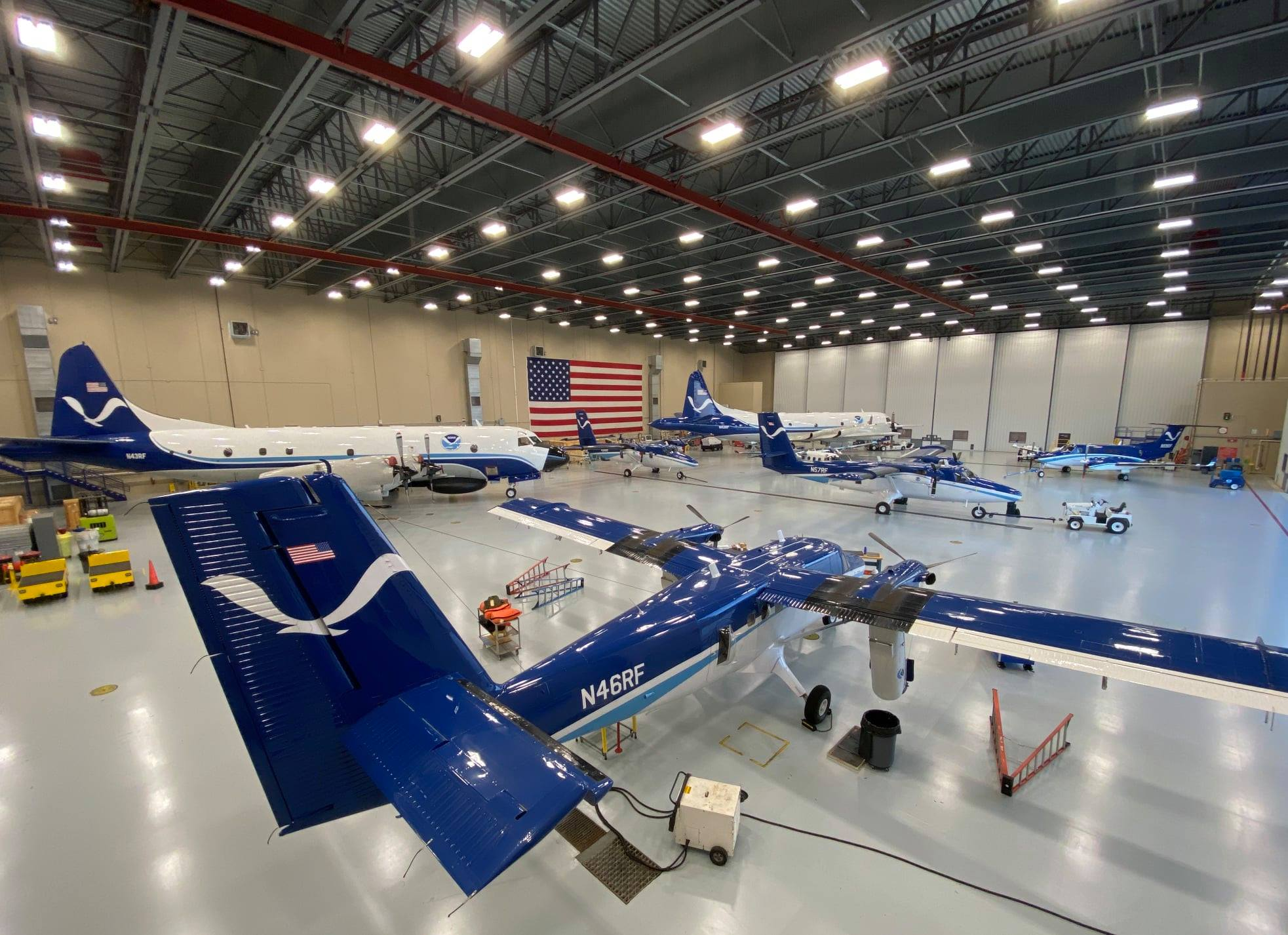
    Planes in the NOAA Aircraft Operations Center hangar in Lakeland, Florida
    - Marine Debris Program (MDP)
- National Weather Service (NWS)
  - List of National Weather Service Weather Forecast Offices; 122 Weather Forecast Offices (NWS WFO)
  - National Centers for Environmental Prediction (NCEP)
    - Aviation Weather Center (AWC)
    - Climate Prediction Center (CPC)
    - Environmental Modeling Center (EMC)
    - National Hurricane Center (NHC)
      - Hurricane Forecast Improvement Program (HFIP)
    - Ocean Prediction Center (OPC)
    - Space Weather Prediction Center (SWPC)
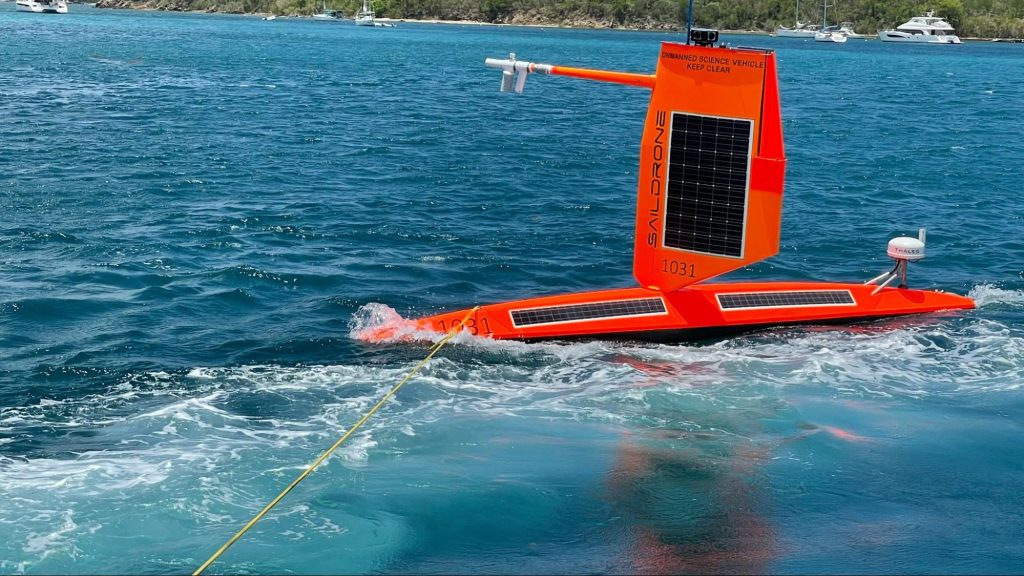
    - NOAA saildrone in the Virgin Islands, used for hurricane observation
      Storm Prediction Center (SPC); inside the National Weather Center (NWC)
    - Hydrometeorological Prediction Center (HPC); Dissolved in 2013
    - Weather Prediction Center (WPC)
  - Radar Operations Center (ROC); partly inside the National Weather Center (NWC)
  - River Forecast Centers (RFC)
  - Center Weather Service Units (CWSU)
  - National Data Buoy Center (NDBC)
- Office of Oceanic and Atmospheric Research (OAR or NOAA Research)
  - Atlantic Oceanographic and Meteorological Laboratory (AOML)
    - Hurricane Research Division (HRD)
  - Air Resources Laboratory (ARL)
  - Earth System Research Laboratories (ESRL)
    - Physical Sciences Laboratory (PSL)
      - Forecast Informed Reservoir Operations (FIRO)
  - Geophysical Fluid Dynamics Laboratory (GFDL)
  - Great Lakes Environmental Research Laboratory (GLERL)
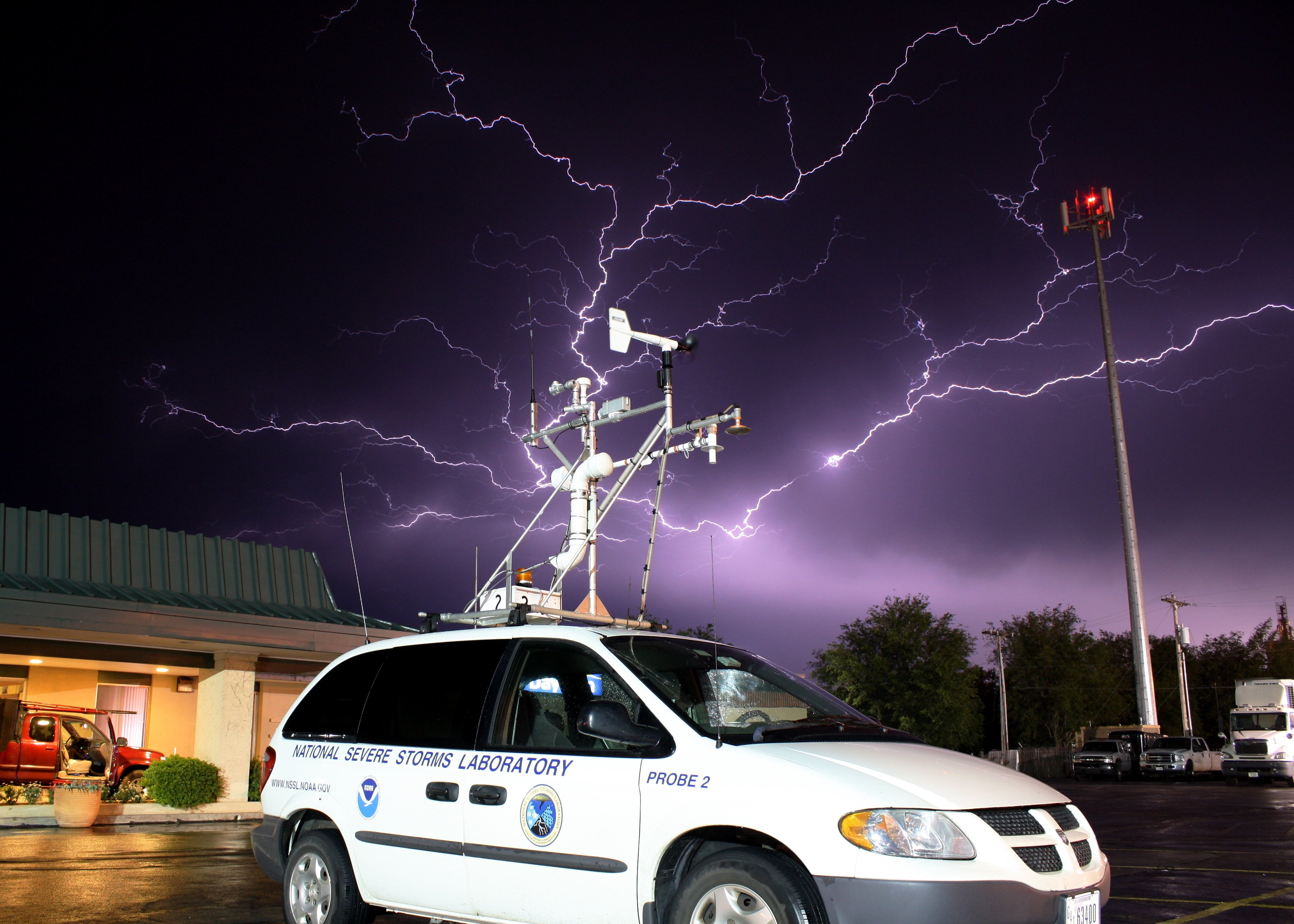
  - Research vehicle from the National Severe Storms Laboratory parked in front of an active thunderstorm
    National Severe Storms Laboratory (NSSL); inside the National Weather Center (NWC)
    - VORTEX projects
    - TOtable Tornado Observatory (TOTO)
    - Automated NonContact Hydrologic Observation in Rivers (ANCHOR)
    - Mid-latitude Continental Convective Clouds Experiment (MC3E); Dissolved 2011
    - Hydrological cycle in the Mediterranean EXperiment (HyMeX); Dissolved 2012
    - Dynamics of the Madden-Julian Oscillation experiment (DYNAMO); Dissolved 2012
    - Plains Elevated Convection At Night (PECAN); Dissolved 2015
    - Hazardous Weather Testbed (HWT)
    - Warn-on-Forecast (WoF or WoFS)
    - Targeted Observation by Radars and UAS of Supercells (TORUS)
    - Propagation, Evolution, and Rotation in Linear Storms (PERiLS)
    - Forecasting a Continuum of Environmental Threats (FACETs); Proposed office
  - Pacific Marine Environmental Laboratory (PMEL)
  - Climate Program Office (CPO)
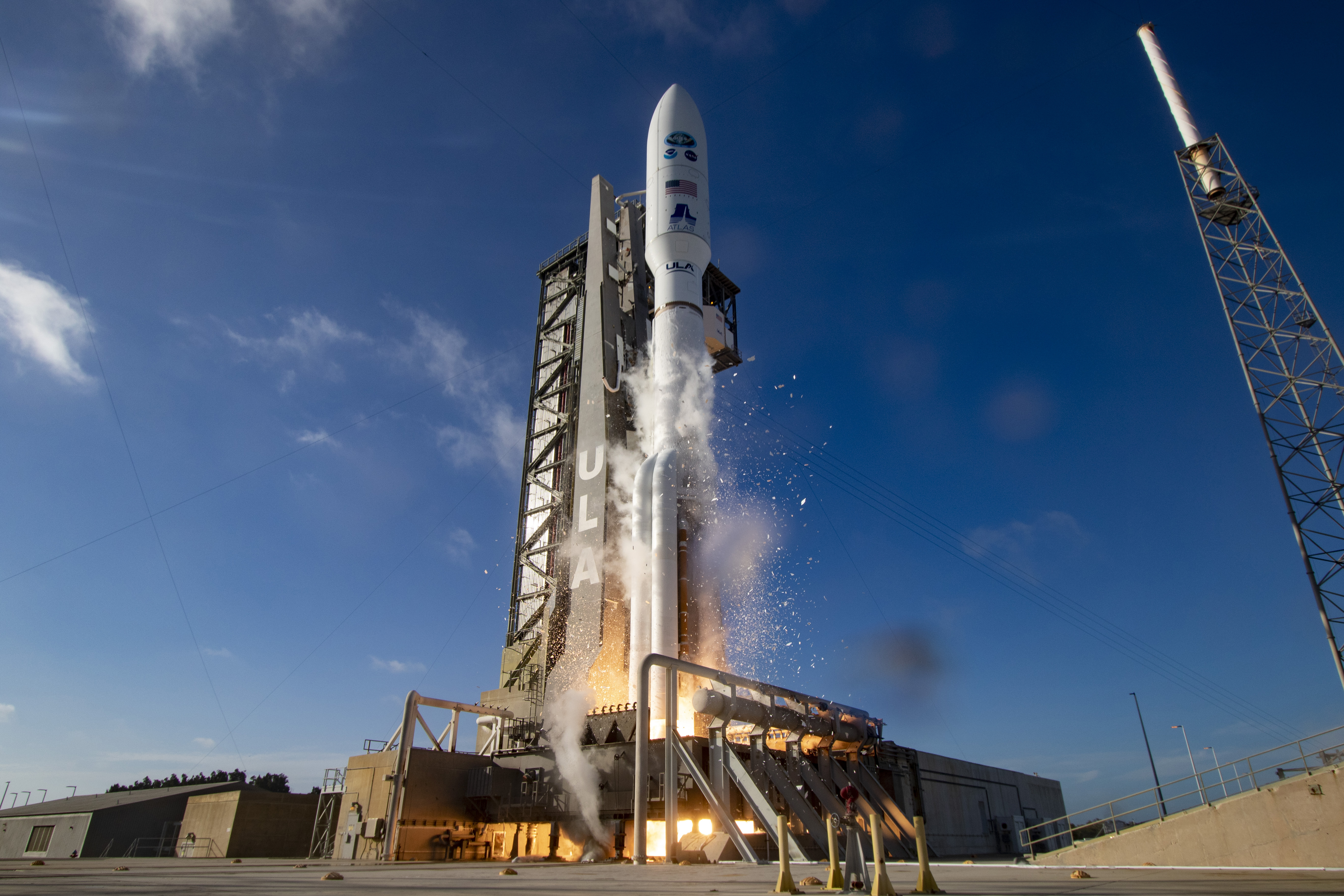
  - An Atlas V rocket launched from Cape Canaveral carrying NOAA's GOES-T satellite
    Uncrewed Systems Research Transition Office (UxSRTO); Dissolved in March 2024
  - Cooperative Institutes; partially funded/operated by NOAA OAR
    - Cooperative Institute for Climate Science (CICS-P)
    - Cooperative Institute for Climate and Satellites (CICS-M)
    - Cooperative Institute for Arctic Research (CIFAR)
    - Cooperative Institute for Limnology and Ecosystems Research (CILER)
    - Cooperative Institute for Marine and Atmospheric Studies (CIMAS)
    - Cooperative Institute for Marine Ecosystems and Climate (CIMEC)
    - Cooperative Institute for Severe and High-Impact Weather Research and Operations (CIWRO); inside the National Weather Center (NWC)
    - Cooperative Institute for Marine Resources Studies (CIMRS)
    - Cooperative Institute for Meteorological Satellite Studies (CIMSS)
    - Cooperative Institute for the North Atlantic Region (CINAR)
    - Cooperative Institute for Ocean Exploration, Research, and Technology (CIOERT)
    - Cooperative Institute for Research in the Atmosphere (CIRA)
    - Cooperative Institute for Research in Environmental Sciences (CIRES)
    - Joint Institute for Marine and Atmospheric Research (CIPIR/JIMAR)
    - Joint Institute for the Study of the Atmosphere and Ocean (JISAO)
    - Northern Gulf Institute (NGI)
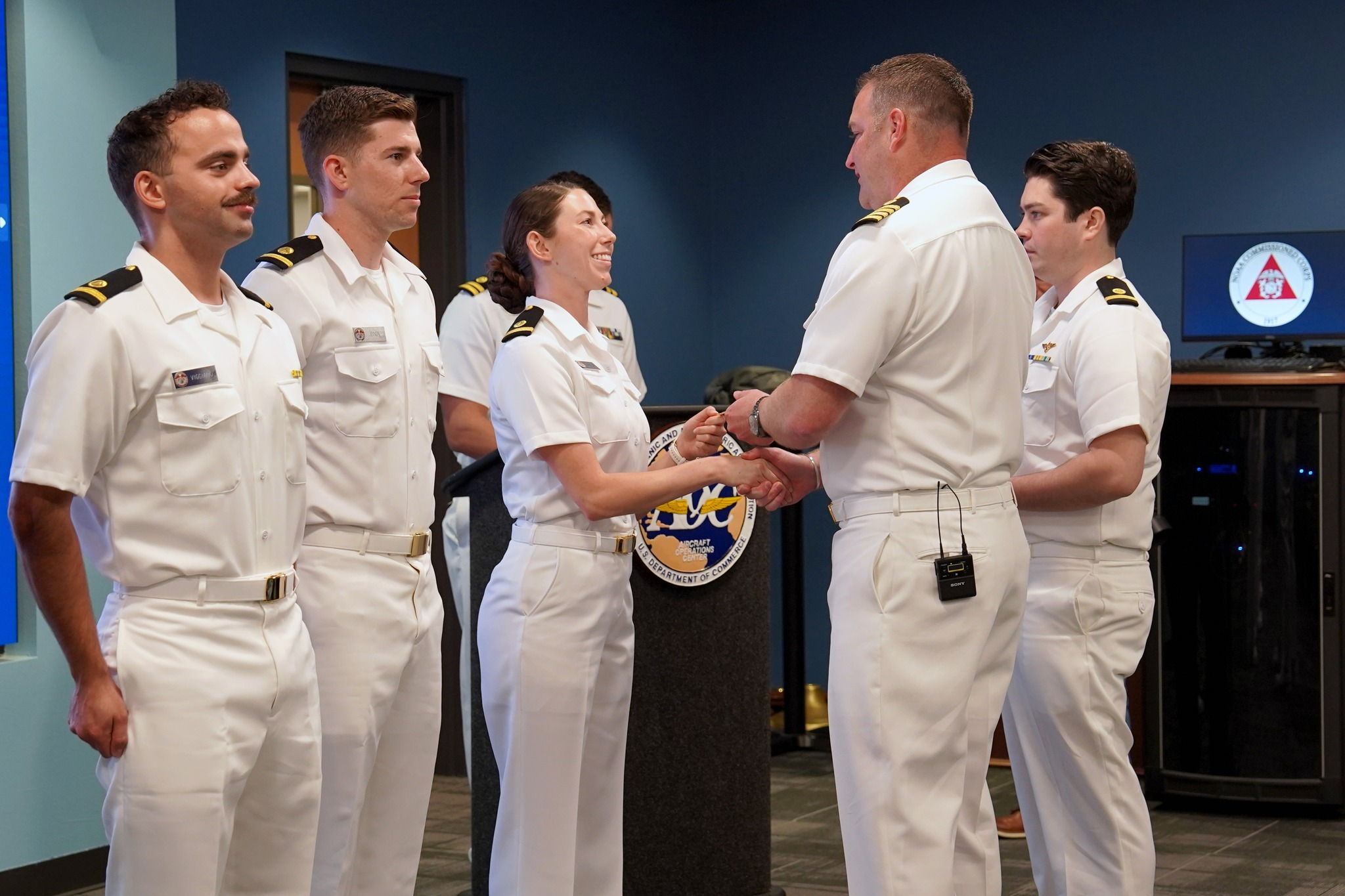
      NOAA Corps officers take part in a formal ceremony.
  - NOAA Nursing Mothers Program (NOAA NMP)
- Office of Marine and Aviation Operations (OMAO)
- U.S. National Geodetic Survey (NGS)
- NOAA Commissioned Officer Corps (NOAA Corps)
  - Aircraft Operations Center (AOC)
- National Integrated Drought Information System (NIDIS)
- U.S. National Ice Center (USNIC); Jointly owned and operated by the Department of Defense (DOD) and Department of Homeland Security (DHS)

== Intergovernmental Panel on Climate Change ==
In 2001, the chair of the Intergovernmental Panel on Climate Change's working group on climate science became Susan Solomon, an atmospheric chemist at NOAA's Boulder, Colorado offices. With co-chair Qin Dahe of Working Group 1 she produced the IPCC Fourth Assessment Report (AR4, 2007). She and other IPCC scientists, along with Vice President Al Gore, received the 2007 Nobel Peace Prize.

== Hurricane Dorian forecast ==
Hurricane Dorian was an extremely powerful and destructive tropical cyclone that devastated the northwestern Bahamas and caused significant damage to the Southeastern United States and Atlantic Canada in September 2019. By September 1, NOAA had issued a statement saying that the "current forecast path of Dorian does not include Alabama". However, on that date, President Donald Trump tweeted that Alabama, among other states, "will most likely be hit (much) harder than anticipated".

Shortly thereafter, the Birmingham, Alabama office of the National Weather Service issued a tweet that appeared to contradict Trump, saying that Alabama "will NOT see any impacts from Dorian". On September 6, NOAA published a statement from an unidentified spokesperson supporting Trump's false September 1 claim. The statement also labelled the Birmingham, Alabama branch of the National Weather Service's contradiction of Trump as incorrect. The New York Times reported that the NOAA September 6 statement was prompted by a threat from U.S. Commerce Secretary Wilbur Ross to fire high-level NOAA staff unless they supported Trump's inaccurate claim. The Department of Commerce described this report as "false".

Meanwhile, The Washington Post reported that NOAA had twice ordered National Weather Service employees not to provide "any opinion" on Hurricane Dorian and to "only stick with official National Hurricane Center forecasts". The first order came after Trump's inaccurate September 1 comments and the Birmingham, Alabama National Weather Service's contradiction of Trump. The second order came on September 4 after Trump displayed an August 29 map that was altered with a black marker to show that Hurricane Dorian may hit Alabama.

On September 9, speaking at an Alabama National Weather Service (NWS) meeting the Director of the National Weather Service gave a speech supporting Birmingham NWS and said the team "stopped public panic" and "ensured public safety". He said that when Birmingham issued their instructions they were not aware that the calls they were receiving were a result of Trump's tweet. The acting chief scientist and assistant administrator for the ocean and atmospheric research said he is "pursuing the potential violations" of the agency's scientific integrity policy.

== Flag ==
Flag of NOAA

The NOAA flag is a modification of the flag of one of its predecessor organizations, the United States Coast and Geodetic Survey. The Coast and Geodetic Survey's flag, authorized in 1899 and in use until 1970, was blue, with a white circle centered in it and a red triangle centered within the circle. It symbolized the use of triangulation in surveying, and was flown by ships of the Survey.

When NOAA was established in 1970 and the Coast and Geodetic Survey's assets became a part of NOAA, NOAA based its own flag on that of the Coast and Geodetic Survey. The NOAA flag is, in essence, the Coast and Geodetic Survey flag, with the NOAA logo—a circle divided by the silhouette of a seabird into an upper dark blue and a lower light blue section, but with the "NOAA" legend omitted—centered within the red triangle. NOAA ships in commission display the NOAA flag; those with only one mast fly it immediately beneath the ship's commissioning pennant or the personal flag of a civilian official or flag officer if one is aboard the ship, while multimasted vessels fly it at the masthead of the forwardmost mast. NOAA ships fly the same ensign as United States Navy ships but fly the NOAA flag as a distinguishing mark to differentiate themselves from Navy ships.

== See also ==
- Center for Environmental Technology (CET)
- Climate Mirror – Movement to preserve primarily government-hosted data sets
- Earth Science Information Partners (ESIP Federation) – Earth science and data management
- List of auxiliaries of the United States Navy
- Marine Mammal Protection Act – Act of the United States Congress in 1972
- NOAA National Operational Model Archive and Distribution System (NOMADS) – Climate and weather data provider
- NOAAS Okeanos Explorer – Exploratory vessel for the National Oceanic and Atmospheric Administration
- NOAA's Environmental Real-time Observation Network – US weather observation network
- SciLands, also known as NOAA's Virtual World Program – Area in the virtual world Second Life
- Office of Naval Research – Office within the United States Department of the Navy
- Title 15 of the Code of Federal Regulations – U.S. federal rules and regulations on commerce and foreign trade
- United States Fish and Wildlife Service – United States federal government agency
- United States Naval Research Laboratory – U.S. Navy research laboratory
- University-National Oceanographic Laboratory System
- Volcanic Ash Advisory Center – United Nations expert group
- Weather Modification Operations and Research Board – Act of intentionally altering or manipulating the weather

Former:

- Environmental Science Services Administration – Former U.S. government scientific agency
- Minerals Management Service – Former United States government agency
- United States Coast and Geodetic Survey – Former U.S. government scientific agency
- United States Fish Commission – Former U.S. government fisheries agency
