= Science policy of the second Trump administration =

During the second presidency of Donald Trump, the US government has seen broad funding freezes and cuts (or proposed cuts). Broad research areas targeted so far have included addiction, climate change, cancer research, vaccine hesitancy, HIV/AIDS research, COVID-19, mental health, and mRNA. The administration has notably paused research funding related to LGBTQ and other gender issues, diversity, equity, and inclusion, race and ethnicity, and other topics deemed "woke".

Some of the funding freezes have been used to apply pressure to universities on non-science related matters. For example the University of San Diego, a school that contains a massive research program for students. Due to the budget cuts from the Trump administration, the university experienced a decrease in funding.

== Early actions ==
Early Trump executive orders led to government organizations removing or modifying over 8,000 web pages and approximately 3,000 datasets, many of them science-related.

In addition, there were freezes in scientific funding and purges of data related to LGBTQ issues, gender, climate change, and racial diversity. There were also mass firings across federal scientific agencies.

The National Science Foundation (NSF) ceased paying out its grants to researchers leaving many without a salary. Grant review panels—in which scientists decide which research proposals will receive funding—were paused to review whether projects supported potentially banned activities such as increasing diversity among scientists, international collaborations, or research into environmentally-friendly technology. After a court order on February 2, the NSF funds were unfrozen, though the review panels were still paused. On February 4, 2025, the NSF announced that it would lay off 25% to 50% of its workforce. Ten percent of NSF staff (168 employees) were fired on February 18. The firings were aimed at probationary employees (those who had held their positions for less than a year), but some of the laid off employees included those with over a year of experience who were unknowingly reclassified in January by the Office of Personnel Management and others who were permanent staff. Sethuraman Panchanathan resigned as NSF director on April 24, 2025.

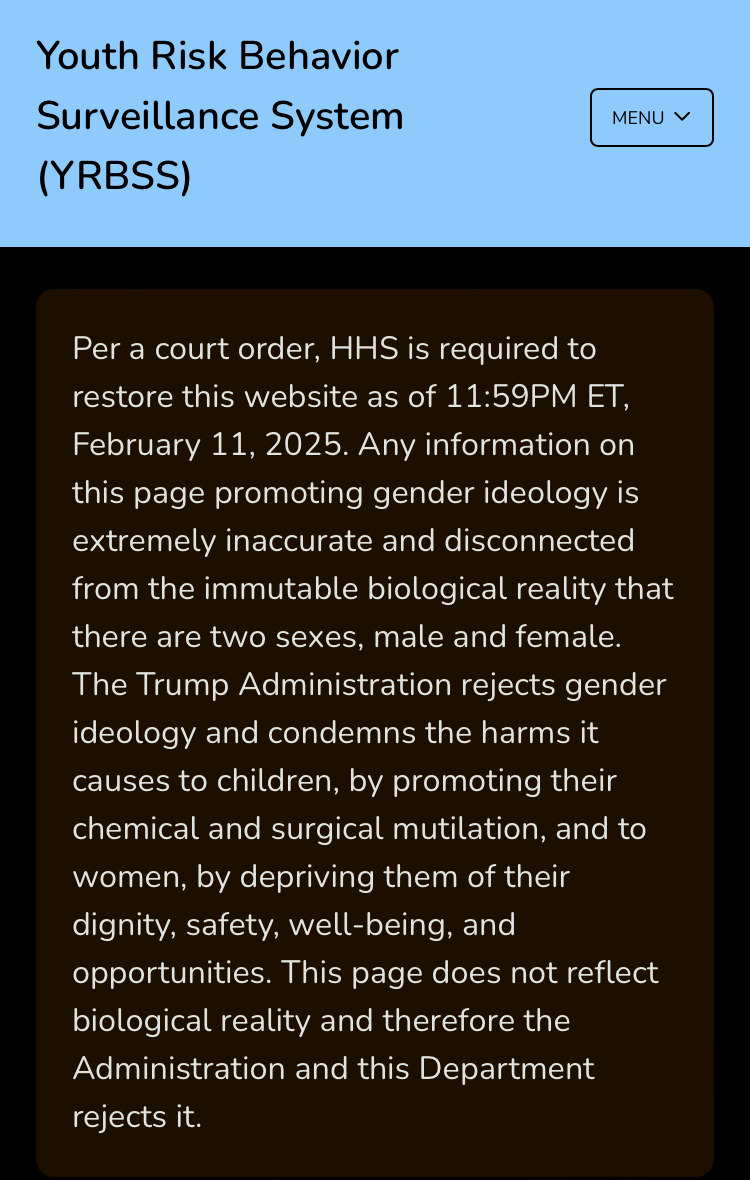
Many government web pages about gender and diversity, which were taken down before being restored by a court order, began showing a disclaimer about the administration's beliefs on sex and gender.

The Trump administration ordered a suspension of National Institutes of Health (NIH) grant funding on January 27, which froze much of its $47 billion budget. The order was blocked by courts after legal challenges but continued when the government exploited a loophole in which they refused to publish the agency's meeting plans in the Federal Register. The NIH announced on February 7 that it would cap support for indirect costs in grants to institutions at 15% of a grant's value. Indirect costs cover expenses that are not directly related to research but are necessary to support it, such as rent for facilities, utilities like heat and electricity, or janitorial and administrative staff. Indirect costs typically range from 30% to 70%, and the cuts represent "tens to hundreds of millions of dollars" in lost funding for research institutes that could lead to layoffs, hiring freezes, and ending research projects. The cuts had previously been outlined in Project 2025 to combat what it characterized as subsidies for "leftist agendas" and diversity, equity, and inclusion efforts. In response, 22 state attorneys general filed a lawsuit and the cuts were paused on February 10. The NIH fired 1,000 to 1,200 workers on February 15. The cuts have led to universities pausing or reducing admissions for graduate biomedical research and medical school programs and hiring of postdoctoral researchers, and the NIH cancelling undergraduate internships and postbaccalaureate programs. Reports in mid-March stated that the NIH was expected to fire 3,400 to 5,000 people from its 20,000 person workforce.

The Centers for Disease Control and Prevention's (CDC) social vulnerability index and environmental justice index, which measured disparities in health risks, were removed from the organization's website, and on January 31, the data portal was taken completely offline in response to Executive Order 14168, which mandated that federal agencies use "sex" instead of "gender" and that they only recognize male and female sexes. AtlasPlus, an interactive CDC tool for tracking diseases such as HIV, hepatitis, sexually transmitted infections, and tuberculosis, was taken down. Census web pages about sexual identity and orientation were taken offline, and CDC pages about HIV and LGBTQ+ youth also disappeared. According to The Atlantic, the Trump administration targeted and replaced keywords in CDC content, including "pregnant people, transgender, binary, non-binary, gender, assigned at birth, binary [sic], non-binary [sic], cisgender, queer, gender identity, gender minority, anything with pronouns". About 750 CDC employees were fired over the weekend of February 15 with leadership stating that 10% (1,300) would be notified of their termination. The Food and Drug Administration purged online material on clinical trial diversity that encouraged drug developers to test the effects of medical treatments on different populations. After a court order, many web pages were restored. The administration added a disclaimer to the restored websites that notes the administration's opposition to what it terms "gender ideology", claiming it is "inaccurate".

Layoffs at the National Oceanic and Atmospheric Administration (NOAA) began on February 27, 2025 when 880 employees (approximately 5% of the organization) were fired. The administration stated that no critical employees such as National Weather Service (NWS) meteorologists were cut, though a source within the NWS reported to CBS News that meteorologists were included in the layoffs.

In some cases, the government attempted to rehire scientists. Members of the technical staff at the Department of Energy's National Nuclear Security Administration, which oversees the nuclear arsenal, were fired on February 13; attempts to contact them for rehiring failed because their emails had been disconnected. The Department of Agriculture fired several scientists working on the ongoing avian flu outbreak over the same weekend and attempted to rehire them. Members of the CDC's Epidemic Intelligence Service were told their positions were eliminated, but the decision was reversed after an outcry.

There were dismissals of thousands of researchers and other employees of the Departments of Agriculture, Veterans Affairs, Health and Human Services (including the National Institutes of Health (NIH) and Centers for Disease Control and Prevention (CDC)), and National Oceanic and Atmospheric Administration (NOAA).

There were controversial appointments, such as those of anti-vaccine advocate and conspiracy theorist Robert F. Kennedy Jr. as Secretary of Health and Human Services; climate change denialist Lee Zeldin as Administrator of the Environmental Protection Agency; and World Wrestling Entertainment (WWE) co-founder Linda McMahon as secretary of education.

There were threats to defund major universities, and actions such as freezing dozens of Department of Energy grants to Princeton University.

"Research programs based primarily on artificial and non-scientific categories, including amorphous equity objectives, are antithetical to the scientific inquiry, do nothing to expand our knowledge of living systems, provide low returns on investment, and ultimately do not enhance health, lengthen life, or reduce illness. Worse, so-called diversity, equity, and inclusion ("DEI") studies are often used to support unlawful discrimination on the basis of race and other protected characteristics, which harms the health of Americans."

— Many researchers received this boilerplate explanation when their funding was cut.

There were mass deletions of open-access datasets, papers, and study protocols from across the federal government. A New York Times analysis of funding through April identified 1,389 awards from the NIH that were cancelled and over 1,000 more that had been delayed, a reduction of $1.6 billion, or about one-fifth compared to the previous year. In the preceding decade, there were about 20 awards terminated each year (usually for circumstances like research misconduct or illness) and since 2012, fewer than five had been terminated for violating the NIH's terms and conditions. A ProPublica investigation spoke to over 150 researchers whose funding had been cut and identified over 30 clinical trials that were abruptly cancelled as well as studies into preventing stillbirths, child suicides, and infant brain damage.

According to the New York Times, government agencies also began compiling lists of keywords to search for to find grants to eliminate. Duke University's Chronicle reported that this approach led to cancellations of grants unrelated to DEI because they used the "trans-" prefix, such as in "transgenic material" or "signal transduction", or contained words like "systemic" in the context of neural circuits.

The administration proposed removing the NSF from its headquarters in Alexandria, Virginia, which would displace over 1,800 employees and give the space to the Department of Housing and Urban Development (HUD). The NSF employee union claimed plans for the space included a dedicated executive suite with a dining room and gym for secretary of HUD Scott Turner, which Turner denied. The building had been completed in 2017 with specifications to house the NSF.

== Budget plans ==
In April 2025, budget planning documents within the Trump administration indicated the intention to reduce funding for a variety of science agencies in Fiscal Year 2026, which begins on October 1, 2025:

- Centers for Disease Control and Prevention: reduce funding from $9.2 billion to $5.2 billion, a 44% cut.
- National Aeronautics and Space Administration science directorate: reduce funding from $7.5 billion to $3.9 billion, a 52% cut.
- National Institutes of Health: reduce funding from $47 billion to $27 billion, a 40% cut. Eliminate National Institute on Minority Health and Health Disparities and the National Institute of Nursing Research.
- National Oceanic and Atmospheric Administration: reduce funding from $6.1 billion to $4.5 billion, a 26% cut. Eliminate the Office of Oceanic and Atmospheric Research.
- National Science Foundation: reduce funding from $9 billion to $4, a 55% cut.

These budget plans were reported in the press at the "passback" stage, at which the Office of Management and Budget sends its preferred revisions to agency budget requests. These cuts were formalized in the administration's FY 2026 budget, released on May 2.

== Scientific publishing ==
Multiple scientific journals received letters in April 2025 from the Department of Justice under interim U.S. attorney for the District of Columbia, Edward R. Martin Jr. asking six questions about their editorial processes. Journals receiving the letter included CHEST and the New England Journal of Medicine (NEJM). A former editor in chief of Science stated the letters were an attempt to intimidate scientists, and other experts stated they could have a chilling effect. Prior to inauguration, Robert F. Kennedy Jr. had mentioned potentially prosecuting journals for not publishing "real science", naming NEJM specifically. Other journals had received the letters but did not reveal it out of fear of retribution.

Kennedy stated on the Ultimate Human podcast that government scientists would no longer publish in preeminent journals such as NEJM, The Lancet, or The Journal of the American Medical Association (JAMA), believing them to be corrupt and controlled by the pharmaceutical industry; instead, scientists would publish in government-run journals. This would be a historical reversal, as peer review arose in the country to avoid undue government influence on research. Funding sources for such journals were not specified, and at the time two NIH-funded journals had paused activities because of funding uncertainty, and Health and Human Services (HHS) had proposed cutting two journals run by the CDC.

The administration began cutting subscriptions in June to Springer Nature, which publishes over 3000 journals including its flagship Nature. NIH officials initially stated that their subscriptions remained, though an HHS spokesperson later stated all contracts with Springer Nature were terminated, stating "Precious taxpayer dollars should be [sic] not be used on unused subscriptions to junk science".

== Reactions and consequences ==
Largely made by executive order, the cuts are drawing many lawsuits and marches and rallies against them.

By February 2025, the scale of funding in question began raising concerns of "brain drain", and 75% of scientists responding to a March survey by Nature were considering leaving the country. On March 31, an open letter for the American people was published, warning the danger of attacks on science from the Trump administration, including threats to universities, federal grant cancelations and ideological funding reviews, mass federal government layoffs, resignations and censorship. It was signed by over 1,900 scientists of the National Academies of Sciences, Engineering and Medicine. The letter stated "We see real danger in this moment, [...] We hold diverse political beliefs, but we are united as researchers in wanting to protect independent scientific inquiry. We are sending this SOS to sound a clear warning: the nation's scientific enterprise is being decimated. [...] If our country's research enterprise is dismantled, we will lose our scientific edge. [...] The damage to our nation's scientific enterprise could take decades to reverse."

By April, US scientists are reportedly looking for career opportunities abroad in greater numbers due to the administration's slashing of science funding and workforce numbers, with a 32% increase in applications for jobs abroad and a 35% increase in US-based users browsing jobs abroad, with economists considering which other countries might benefit most.

In June, over 300 NIH staff signed the Bethesda Declaration condemning mass layoffs and program cuts and calling on Jay Bhattacharya to restore funding to the agency. The letter was co-signed by thousands of scientists internationally and over 20 Nobel laureates. Also that month a federal judge ruled that the cutting of hundreds of NIH grants for ostensible focus on gender identity or DEI was "arbitrary and capricious" and ordered that grants be restored.

Historian Paul Josephson compared the damage to American science done by the appointment of Robert F. Kennedy, Jr., to the promotion of Lysenkoism in the Stalinist Soviet Union over the correct biological understanding of genetics after the appointment of Trofim Lysenko in 1940. Josephson also compared the more general repression of science in the Soviet Union to Trumpist attacks on universities and scientific research.

The 2026 International Congress of Mathematicians in Philadelphia was the target of a major boycott by over 2,300 mathematicians from 76+ countries due to Donald Trump policies on science and mathematics.

== See also ==
- Anti-intellectualism
- Censorship
- Political interference with science agencies by the first Trump administration
- 2025 United States government online resource removals
- Science policy of the United States
- Science and technology in the United States
- United States federal budget
- NOAA under the second presidency of Donald Trump
- Weather modification projects during the second presidency of Donald Trump
