= NOAA in the second Trump administration =

NOAA under the second presidency of Donald Trump
- Employees terminated: 850–880
- Buyouts or resignations: 1,029

Department of Government Efficiency involvement
- Contracts terminated: 196
- Contract total value: $133,927,153.01 (2025 USD; As of June 29)
- Claimed contract savings: $42,481,923.88 (2025 USD; As of June 29)
- Claimed grants terminated: 4
- Leases terminated: 8–19
- Claimed lease savings: $2,390,754–$7,177,962 (2025 USD; As of June 29)

Following the second inauguration of Donald Trump as President of the United States, and the creation of the Department of Government Efficiency (DOGE) on January 20, 2025, several major changes occurred at the National Oceanic and Atmospheric Administration (NOAA), including hundreds of employees being terminated, dozens of federal contracts and leases being terminated, and the enactment of executive orders which affected the operations of NOAA. The operations of the National Weather Service (NWS) were affected, with several offices stopping weather balloon launches, and NOAA databases and websites went offline. The National Weather Service was also the target of domestic terrorism threats for conspiracy theories regarding weaponizing the weather.

== Federal employee buyouts, resignations, and terminations ==
On February 27, 2025, the Office of Personnel Management (OPM) abruptly terminated around 880 employees, over 7.3% of the total staff from the National Oceanic and Atmospheric Administration (NOAA). Before the terminations, NOAA had approximately 12,000 employees that included 6,773 scientists and engineers. Shortly after the firings, William Alsup, Senior Judge of the United States District Court for the Northern District of California, ruled that the OPM "had no authority to order the firings of probationary employees".

Rick Spinrad, the former NOAA Administrator who was picked by former president Joe Biden, stated firings occurred at the National Hurricane Center and Storm Prediction Center. Spinrad stated 25% of the NOAA Environmental Modeling Center was terminated. Congressman Jared Huffman responded to the firings by saying the entire American public "depend on NOAA for free, accurate forecasts, severe weather alerts, and emergency information". Daniel Swain, a scientist at the University of California, in response to the firings said, "Most or all private weather companies in US (including forecasts that you see on TV or your favorite app) are built directly atop backbone of taxpayer-funded instrumentation, data, predictive modeling, & forecasts provided by NOAA". On March 5, 113 members of the United States Congress sent a letter to the United States Department of Commerce to "express profound outrage" to the termination of 880 NOAA employees. The 113 members of Congress went on to say:

"The termination of hundreds of dedicated scientists, meteorologists, and ocean experts, particularly from the National Weather Service, is a reckless decision that puts American lives at risk, undermines critical climate research now and in the future, and threatens the economic well-being of communities across the nation...The assertion that these layoffs will somehow improve “efficiency” is not only misleading but outright dangerous. Efficiency is not only measured in dollars saved but more importantly in lives protected and disasters mitigated. NOAA saves money and American lives. In 2020, NOAA’s hurricane forecasting saved approximately $5 billion per major hurricane landfall. NOAA’s mission is to provide accurate, science-driven information that helps communities prepare for and respond to environmental threats. A reduction in personnel cripples the very infrastructure that Americans depend on to withstand climate-driven catastrophes."

— 113 members of the United States Congress

On March 6, over 1,000 people protested outside of the NOAA office complex in Boulder, Colorado and on March 7, a protest occurred outside of the National Weather Center in Norman, Oklahoma; both to protest the 880 NOAA terminations.

On March 8, The New York Times reported at least 1,000 more NOAA employees were set to be terminated, downsizing NOAA's pre-terminations workforce by 20%. Throughout the day on March 8, several terminated NOAA employees posted on X and Bluesky they were rehired by the Department of Commerce. Andy Hazelton, a former physical scientist at the NOAA Environmental Modeling Center (EMC), reported none of the EMC terminated employees were rehired. However, on April 10, reports came out that some probationary employees had been "re-fired" after being placed on administrative leave in mid-March.

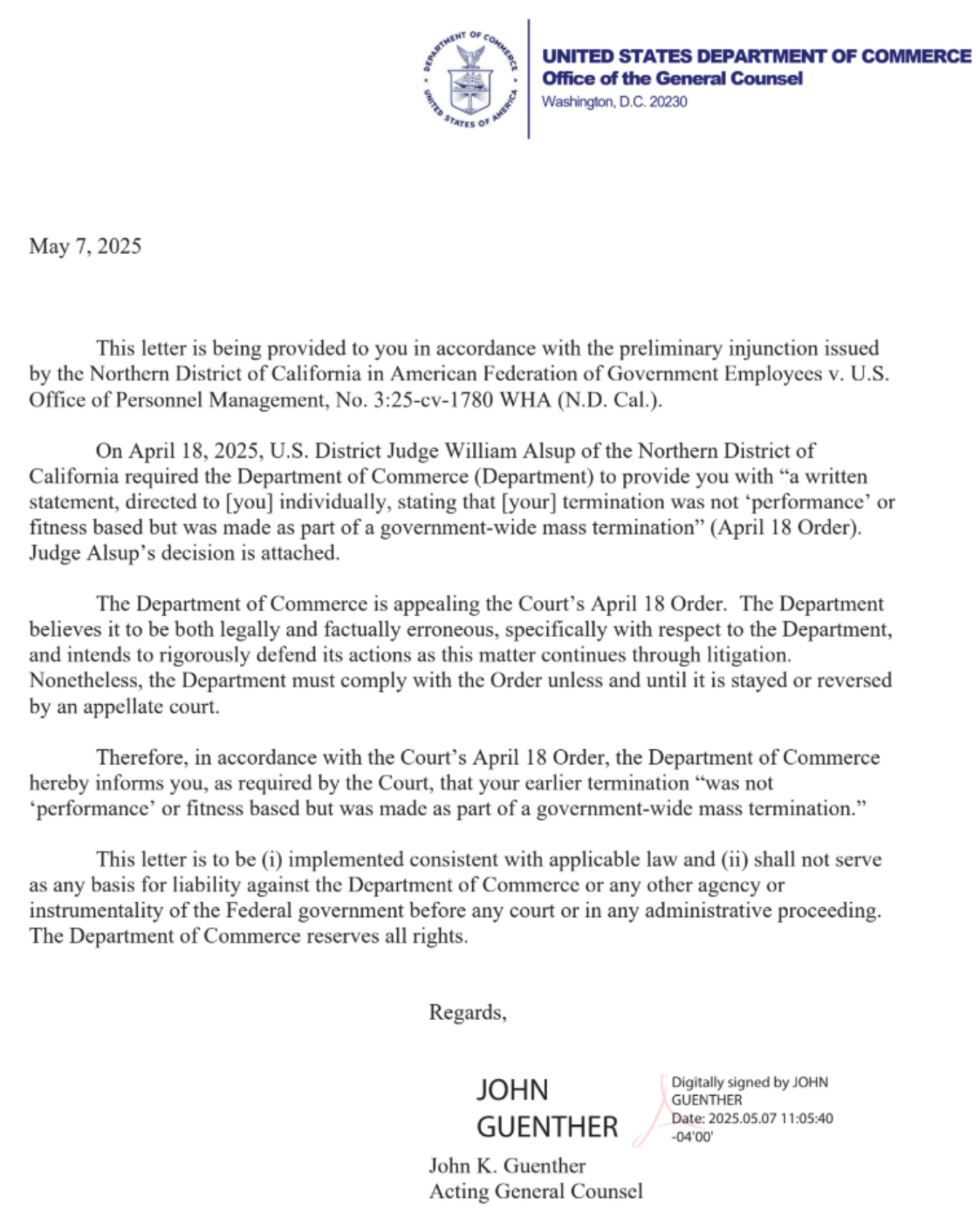
The letter sent to all NOAA terminated probationary employees on May 7

On April 22, NOAA approved the deferred resignations or buyouts of 1,029 NOAA employees, which was offered by President Donald Trump to all U.S. government employees on January 28, 2025.

On May 7, the Department of Commerce (DOC) sent a letter to all 880 probationary employees that were fired on February 27 and those rehired and refired on April 10. The letter stated its issuance to the fired probationary employees was ordered by Judge William Alsup of the U.S. District Court for the Northern District of California. The letter stated Judge Alsup determined the probationary employees were not fired based on the initial firing reasonings of "performance or fitness based" but was rather "part of a government-wide mass termination". John Guenther, the Department of Commerce's acting General Counsel stated in the letter, "the Department believes it to be both legally and factually erroneous" on employees not being fired based on "performance or fitness based" reasonings, and that the DOC "intends to rigorously defend its actions as this matter continues through litigation".

On May 30, the White House released that only 850 probationary employees from the entire Department of Commerce were fired, not that 880 were fired from NOAA, a single branch of the Department of Commerce.

=== Effects of the terminations ===
Operational; Reduced; Closed

A weather balloon launch station maintained by the National Weather Service in Alaska was forced to cease launches due to the terminations resulting in staff shortages. The NOAA Great Lakes Environmental Research Laboratory (GLERL), a branch of the Office of Oceanic and Atmospheric Research announced the terminations resulted in a staff shortage and the office would be taking an "indefinite hiatus". Nicole Rice, an employee at the GLERL who was terminated reported 20% of the GLERL office was terminated. Axios reported that one of the "deepest of NOAA's cuts was to the Office of Space Commerce" (OSC). Researchers, including dual-role University of Oklahoma (OU)-federal researchers at the National Weather Center, located on the OU campus were terminated, which included students in the OU School of Meteorology. Ten employees were fired from the Geophysical Fluid Dynamics Laboratory at Princeton University.

On March 4, the National Weather Service office in Paducah, Kentucky cancelled their student volunteer program and moved to "suspend new arrangements for prospective meteorology students to shadow at our office" due to the terminations. The National Weather Service office in Boston, Massachusetts, had over 36% of its staff terminated, leaving only seven meteorologists, four less than required for minimal staffing to run the 24/7 office. On March 7, the National Weather Service offices in Albany, New York, and Gray, Maine, stopped launching weather balloons due to staffing issues from the terminations. The offices in Omaha, Nebraska, and Rapid City, South Dakota, also stopped launching weather balloons on March 20 due to staff shortages. On March 31, the NWS provided a complete list of offices across the country affected by the cancellation or reduction of weather balloon launches (image to the right). The terminations are expected to cause a loss in the ability to predict events such as blizzards and tornadoes, not only affecting the U.S. but neighboring Canada as well. On March 31, U.S. Representative Mike Flood visited the National Weather Service office in Omaha, Nebraska, saying he would work to restore weather balloon launches at the office.

On May 2, CNN reported there were 30 National Weather Service offices without a lead meteorologist. It was also reported that the National Weather Service office in Goodland, Kansas was the first NWS office no longer operating 24/7 and that "about a dozen more" are likely to stop 24/7 service as well. CNN also reported there were more than 90 vacancies for NOAA NEXRAD-radar technicians and repairmen jobs.

== Involvement of DOGE ==
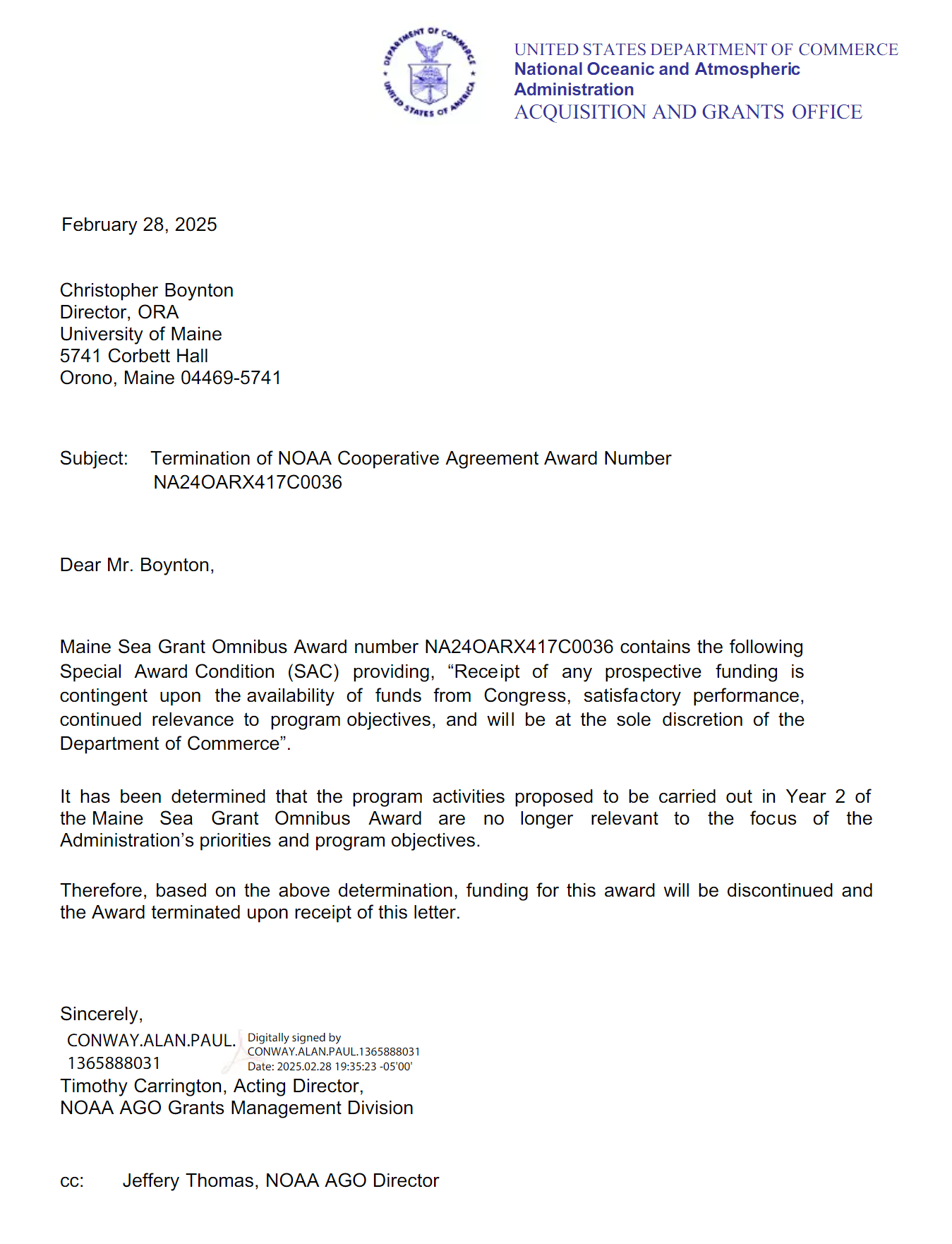
NOAA, at the recommendation of DOGE, terminating a cooperative agreement with the University of Maine

On February 4, 2025, The Guardian reported employees of the Department of Government Efficiency (DOGE) had entered the headquarters of the NOAA in Silver Spring, Maryland, reporting "they apparently just sort of walked past security and said: 'Get out of my way,' and they're looking for access for the IT systems, as they have in other agencies". ABC News reported on February 6 that DOGE employees had gained access to the NOAA computer systems. Staff from the NOAA Information Technology group and the Department of Commerce attempted to keep the operatives from the systems according to security protocols, but the operatives defied authorized security staff and forcefully entered the facilities. Two Democratic Congress members characterized DOGE's presence in NOAA systems as "hackers". NOAA staff noted that the actions of the operatives could directly cause risk to human life by hindering NOAA and National Weather Service operations. ABC also reported that operatives were also looking for anything connected to diversity, equity, and inclusion (DEI) on bulletin boards and were inspecting bathroom signs to ensure compliance with Trump's executive orders.

On February 12, Grist reported that the Trump administration started to shrink the Environmental Protection Agency (EPA), nearly 170 employees at the EPA's Office of Environmental Justice and External Civil Rights were placed on paid administrative leave. On March 2, Ryan Maue, the chief scientist for NOAA during the first presidency of Donald Trump, suggested on X that the United States House of Representatives should redirect all NOAA funds saved by DOGE to the National Weather Service.

On March 9, The Salt Lake Tribune reported the wife of Brent Pounds, a former officer for the NOAA Commissioned Officer Corps, was assisting DOGE and was giving notes to Elon Musk.

=== NOAA contract involvement ===
On February 17, 2025, DOGE released the names of 1,127 federal contracts spanning 39 federal departments and agencies, including the NOAA, that DOGE says had been terminated. A Wall Street Journal analysis of these over 1,000 contracts found inaccuracies of DOGE's reported savings, including counting contracts multiple times, listing contracts that have already been paid as savings, and misrepresenting potential savings based on contract limits rather than actual spending. On February 24, 2025, DOGE released more documents, with the total nearing 2,300 contracts released. The Associated Press found that "nearly 40%" of the terminated contracts would not save the government any money. On March 1, NOAA, at the recommendation of DOGE, terminated the University of Maine's multi-million-dollar Maine Sea Grant, saying "it has been determined that the program activities proposed to be carried out in Year 2 of the Maine Sea Grant Omnibus Award are no longer relevant to the focus of the Administration’s priorities and program objectives". This grant termination has not been announced by DOGE.

As of June 29, 2025, DOGE released 196 NOAA-specific contracts it claims to have terminated, partially terminated, or interacted with, for a total contract value of $133,927,153.01, and a claimed savings of $42,481,923.88. On May 30, 2025, the White House reported DOGE terminated a $5.9 million Department of Commerce contract for "environmental consulting support services", and from that termination it was reported DOGE saved the federal government $613 million. This contract termination has not yet been reported by DOGE yet. In total, the DOGE contract terminations eliminated 0.3846% of the National Weather Service (NWS) budget. Below is an incomplete list of NOAA-specific contracts DOGE terminated, partially terminated, or interacted with.

NOAA department	Contract value	Claimed savings	Description/Notes
NOS	$163,478	$9,800	DOGE announced the termination of a contract with Elevate USA Inc. for "DEIA training" for the National Ocean Service (NOS).
NMFS	$421,548	$366,000	DOGE announced the termination of a contract for "DEIA support services" for the National Marine Fisheries Service (NMFS).
NMFS	$348,400	$164,840	DOGE announced the termination of a contract for "DEIA support services" for the National Marine Fisheries Service's Human Capital Management Office (NMFS HCMO).
NMFS	$1,681,746	$1,034,304	DOGE announced the partial termination of a contract for the National Marine Fisheries Service's "first-ever national Equity and Environmental Justice (EEJ) Strategy to guide the agency as it focuses on serving all communities more equitably and effectively.
OAR	$106,250	$0	DOGE announced the termination of a contract for the Office of Oceanic and Atmospheric Research (OAR) for "non-personal service for JEDI training". The company contracted by NOAA, The Avarna Group LLC, has a company expiration date of January 6, 2026.
OAR	$300,000	$0	DOGE announced the termination of a contract for the Office of Oceanic and Atmospheric Research for study on "diversity, equity, inclusion, belonging, accessibility, and justice on the National Academy of Sciences (NAS) Independent Science Studies (NASISS)".
NWS	$990,087	$0	DOGE announced the termination of a contract for an "organizational climate assessment" for the National Weather Service (NWS) on February 13, 2025. On February 3, prior to the termination, NOAA, at the recommendation of DOGE, modified the contract's value down to $944,319.
OAR	$439,282	$0	DOGE announced the termination of a contract for a "study on equitable distribution of fisheries management" for the Office of Oceanic and Atmospheric Research.
OAR	$9,900,000	$0	DOGE announced the partial termination of a contract for "strategic foresight and performance management consultant services" for the Office of Oceanic and Atmospheric Research. According to HigherGov, the contract was for "administrative management and general management consulting services" with "human resources". The contract started on September 29, 2024, and was originally set to end September 29, 2029, prior to DOGE's termination on February 10, 2025.
NMFS	$184,000	$0	DOGE announced the termination of a contract that would provide "training on equity and environmental justice" to the National Marine Fisheries Service. Per the receipt released by DOGE, it was "last modified" in September 2024.
OAR	$27,000	$0	DOGE announced the termination of a contract with an Australian company to "revise and update the Atlantis Ecosystem model to support NOAA's Earth System Model framework to project the response of fishes and food webs under scenarios of future climate change and invasive species" for the Office of Oceanic and Atmospheric Research. Per the receipt released by DOGE, it was "last modified" in September 2024.
OAR	$500,000	$0	DOGE announced the termination of a contract with the National Academy of Sciences for a "study on drought and climate change" for the Office of Oceanic and Atmospheric Research. Per the receipt released by DOGE, it was "last modified" in June 2024. According to HigherGov, the contract was for a two-year study being conducted by the National Academy of Sciences, which was set to end on June 30, 2026, prior to the termination in February 2025. HigherGov also stated that the study was already "100% funded", but was only "39.0% completed" at the time of termination.
OAR	$643,158	$0	DOGE announced the termination of a contract to provide "science related communication services" to the Office of Oceanic and Atmospheric Research. The termination reason stated by DOGE was that the "company is associated with others not in-line with the President's Agenda".
OAR	$643,880	$107,313	DOGE announced the termination of a contract to provide "science related communication services" to the NOAA Climate Program Office (CPO). The termination reason stated by DOGE was that the "company is associated with others not in-line with the President's Agenda".
NMFS	$3,204,694	$2,598,174	DOGE announced the termination of a contract to provide "video and digital media communications support, video production, & podcasts production" to the National Marine Fisheries Service. NOAA released that the contract was "video production, photography, and digital media support" because NOAA needed to "needed to increase effectiveness and efficiency in communicating with target audiences, including Congress". NOAA also stated this contract was "critical to supporting the agency’s overall strategic communications effort". The contract was originally set to end on September 30, 2029, prior to DOGE's termination recommendation on April 1, 2025.
OAR	$96,639	$0	DOGE announced the termination of a contract for the University of Illinois to "receive, review, and manage data" for the World Data Center and to "establish best practices for data and metadata formatting" for the United Nations' World Meteorological Organization.
NWS	$199,867	$0	DOGE announced the modification of a National Weather Service (NWS)-funded contract from For Your Information, Inc. due to the contracting company being an "office of facilities staffing analysis". The released receipt by DOGE stated the modification was to "extend period of performance by 6 months".
OAR	$36,805	$5,257	DOGE announced the termination of a contract for "coaching services for multiple staff transitioning to a supervisory position" in the NOAA Physical Sciences Laboratory through June 2025.
OCAO	$80,922	$55,998	DOGE announced the termination of a contract for the NOAA Office of the Chief Administrative Officer (OCAO) for "archibus and builder tools, training, and development" from Golden Wolf, LLC.
OAR	$140,000	$105,000	DOGE announced the termination of a contract that was "to provide NOAA with a gold standard partnership at the annual Hispanic Association of Colleges and Universities (HACU) Conference".
NMFS	$277,521	$130,490	DOGE announced the termination of a contract for the "development of strategic and implementation plans" for the NOAA Pacific Islands Fisheries Science Center.
NMFS	$249,977	$146,322	DOGE announced the termination of a contract for an "EEJ project cultural liaison" for the NOAA Pacific Islands Regional Office.
OAR	$466,884	$158,625	DOGE announced the termination of a contract for an "outreach coordinator on the science, engineering and technical support services" for the Office of Oceanic and Atmospheric Research.
NOAA	$567,840	$189,280	DOGE announced the termination of a contract for NOAA' Nursing Mother Program Support.
NOS	$846,483	$227,750	DOGE announced the termination of a contract for "program office coordination and operations support services" for the National Ocean Service.
OAR	$590,273	$446,920	DOGE announced the termination of a contract for "science, engineering, and technical support services" and "other environmental services" from FedWriters, Inc. for the Office of Oceanic and Atmospheric Research.
NOAA	$1,052,914	$631,748	DOGE announced the termination of a contract for "project and program management" for the National Oceanic and Atmospheric Administration. Per the receipt released by DOGE, the contract was "last modified" in September 2023.
OAR	$2,014,381	$1,073,496	DOGE announced the deobligation of $1,073,496 from NOAA's Uncrewed Systems Research Transition Office (UxSRTO), managed by the Office of Oceanic and Atmospheric Research. In July 2023, NOAA's UxSRTO reported they had found "no significant impact for the funding, procurement, and operation of NOAA small uncrewed aircraft systems", and the UxSRTO program was shut down by the OAR in March 2024.
NOS	$2,383,700	$1,854,912	DOGE announced the termination of a contract for "scientific and technical support services for spatial planning" for NOAA's National Centers for Coastal Ocean Science (NCCOS). This contract was over 10.5% of the total NCCOS budget.
OAR	$199,160	$132,210	DOGE announced the termination of a contract for "nonpersonal services to complete manuscript presenting updated pCO2 climatology" from Columbia University's trustees for the NOAA Global Monitoring Laboratory (GML). According to HigherGov, this contract was for Columbia University to do "monitoring, quality control, analysis, and presentation of ocean partial pressure of carbon dioxide (pCO2) observations collected as part of the NOAA Surface water pCO2 measurements from ships program". This contract started on June 30, 2022, and was originally set to end on June 30, 2025, prior to DOGE's termination on March 7, 2025.
NMFS	$148,494	$74,864	DOGE announced the termination of a contract for "administrative support services" for the NOAA National Marine Fisheries Service's California Coastal Office (CCO).
NWS	$35,842	$0	DOGE announced the termination of a contract where the Urethane Products Corporation would provide metal equipment manufacturing and equipment testing for the National Weather Service's National Data Buoy Center (NDBC). According to HigherGov, this contract was for the creation, first tests, and delivery of bridles and buoy masts for the Tropical Atmosphere Ocean project, for the National Data Buoy Center. This contract started on July 8, 2024, and ended December 24, 2024, and all funds had been paid prior to the termination of the already ended contract.
OAR	$22,018,255.42	$0	DOGE announced the termination of a contract for "research and development in the physical, engineering, and life sciences" for the NOAA Office of Oceanic and Atmospheric Research (OAR). On January 30, 2025, NOAA, at the recommendation of DOGE, modified the contract to "add funding" and "add to increase travel funding" by 4%. On February 6, 2025, the contract was again modified at DOGE's recommendation, to "partially terminate" the contract, with the contract's conclusion date being changed from May 31, 2026, to May 31, 2025. According to HigherGov, this contract was actually an extension of a previous contract for the NOAA Climate Program Office, indicating DOGE added funding to the NOAA Climate Program Office.
NMFS	$216,382.54	$0	DOGE announced the termination of a contract for IT support services for the NOAA National Marine Fisheries Service.
OAR	$744,239.60	$0	DOGE announced the termination of a contract for the NOAA Quantitative Observing System Assessment Program (QOSAP), managed by the Office of Oceanic and Atmospheric Research (OAR).
OAR	$1,035,899.10	$0	DOGE announced the termination of a contract for administrative support services for the NOAA Earth System Research Laboratories (ESRL), a branch of the Office of Oceanic and Atmospheric Research (OAR).
OAR	$2,523,441.24	$0	DOGE announced the termination of a contract for "science, engineering, and technical support services" for the NOAA Office of Oceanic and Atmospheric Research. In April 2025, HigherGov reported this contract was not terminated, but was only modified "to remove and update clauses per government policy", and that this contract will end September 14, 2026. HigherGov also reported that $399,900 from this contract was paid "to provide personnel in support of NOAA", prior to the recommendations from DOGE to modify the contract on February 27, 2025.
NOS	$14,999	$0	DOGE announced the termination of a contract between the NOAA National Ocean Service and the Sponsorship Chesapeake Alliance.
NOS	$14,999	$0	DOGE announced the termination of a contract between the NOAA National Ocean Service and the National Society of Black Physicists, Inc.
NMFS	$97,096.78	$0	DOGE announced the termination of a contract for the Sprout Social, social media manager account of the NOAA National Marine Fisheries Service's, because there was an "increase in license price" for the "advanced plan". According to HigherGov, all funds for this "all-in-one social media management" contract were paid on August 30, 2024, and cancelling the contract saved the government $0.
NMFS	$966,066.66	$0	DOGE announced the termination of a contract for "administrative management and general management consulting services" and two "media specialists" for the Alaska Fisheries Science Center (AFSC). DOGE stated this contract was cancelled due to Executive Order 14222, which was signed by President Donald Trump on February 26, 2025. This contract is part of a larger umbrella contract for International Business Sales & Services Corporation to do $25 million in "business admin services" for the National Marine Fisheries Service (NMFS). According to HigherGov, all funds for this contract for a "media specialist" were paid on February 11, 2025, and cancelling the contract saved the government $0.
NMFS	$223,832.80	$113,571	DOGE announced the termination of a contract to pay a "media specialist" for "support services" for the Alaska Fisheries Science Center (AFSC). DOGE stated this contract was cancelled due to Executive Order 14222, which was signed by President Donald Trump on February 26, 2025. This contract is part of a larger umbrella contract for International Business Sales & Services Corporation to do $25 million in "business admin services" for the National Marine Fisheries Service (NMFS).
OAR	$5,913,153.12	$229,341	DOGE announced the partial termination of contract for Earth Resources Technology, Inc. to provide NOAA's Office of Oceanic and Atmospheric Research (OAR) with "environmental consulting support services". DOGE also stated this contract was terminated as a result of an executive order signed by President Donald Trump for "radical transparency about wasteful spending".
NOAA	$50,000	$20,000	DOGE announced the termination of a contract for NOAA to co-sponsor the ASIES Conference, hosted by the American Indian Science and Engineering Society.
NOAA	$462,500	$102,500	DOGE announced the termination of a contract for NOAA to co-sponsor the WOC STEM Conference, hosted by the Career Communications Group, Inc..
NESDIS	$3,448,981	$1,468,939	DOGE announced the partial termination of a contract for NOAA's National Environmental Satellite, Data, and Information Service (NESDIS) to receive "consulting services" from The Mitre Corporation. DOGE also stated this contract was terminated as a result of an executive order signed by President Donald Trump for "radical transparency about wasteful spending".
NMFS	$418,382	$160,804	DOGE announced the termination of a contract for Equal Employment Opportunity (EEO) training for the NOAA National Marine Fisheries Service (NMFS).
OMAO	$162,350–186,800	$24,425	DOGE announced the termination of a contract for "support outreach and recruiting of hard to fill seagoing professional mariner positions for NOAA seagoing research vessels". According to HigherGov, DOGE interacted with the contract three times. On March 24, 2025, DOGE deobligated $49,000 from the contract as NOAA was paying to advertise to Pacific Maritime Magazine and Fishermen's News, both of which are "no longer being published". DOGE then terminated the contract on April 3. On April 22, DOGE reduced the already terminated contract’s value from $186,800 to $162,350, saying it was for "deobligation". The $162,350 is the total contract value released by DOGE, despite the contact being terminated at a value of $186,800.
NMFS	$33,583.31	$5,416.69	DOGE announced the termination of a contract for "graphics illustration for fish passage design" for the National Marine Fisheries Service (NMFS).
NMFS	$744,030	$196,106	DOGE announced the termination of a contract for "NWFSC leadership competency consulting and training" for the National Marine Fisheries Service (NMFS). DOGE stated this contract was cancelled due to Executive Order 14222, which was signed by President Donald Trump on February 26, 2025.
NMFS	$71,209	$36,217	DOGE announced the termination of a contract for the NOAA National Marine Fisheries Service (NMFS) to be on the CEB Risk Management Leadership Council.
NOS	$3,146,250	$2,776,676.88	DOGE announced the termination of a contract "for CPA consulting services for cost documentation packages to remove indirect rate development" for the NOAA National Ocean Service (NOS). DOGE stated this contract was cancelled due to Executive Order 14222, which was signed by President Donald Trump on February 26, 2025.
NWS	$77,567	$0	DOGE announced the termination of a contract for "appropriation law and program management training services" for the National Weather Service (NWS). The contract concluded on April 30, 2025, despite DOGE announcing they terminated the contract on May 5, 2025. DOGE then announced two weeks later that they reterminated this contract on May 19, 2025, indicating it was never terminated back on May 5.
NMFS	$74,600.40	$60,228.12	DOGE announced the termination of a contract for "translations, interpretation, and foreign language recording services" for the National Marine Fisheries Service (NMFS).
NMFS	$7,288	$0	DOGE announced the extension of a contract for a "bioinformatic DNA sequence analysis" for the National Marine Fisheries Service (NMFS) by the Washington Department of Fish and Wildlife based out of UEI College.
NESDIS	$4,855,014.70	$3,749,875.35	DOGE announced the termination of a contract for the cloud servers for the NOAA Comprehensive Large Array-data Stewardship System (CLASS) Cooperative Observer Program (COOP). According to the receipt released by DOGE, this contract termination was approved by NOAA employee Ronald Banzon.
NMFS	$159,030.85	$68,306.40	DOGE announced the termination of a contract for "video support services" for the National Marine Fisheries Service (NMFS).
NMFS	$176,781	$75,924	DOGE announced the termination of the ten different Seabird Necropsy Training Seminars, hosted by the National Marine Fisheries Service (NMFS) at the University of Washington campus.
NMFS	$88,287.60	$0	DOGE announced the termination of a contract for "audio transcription services" for the National Marine Fisheries Service (NMFS). DOGE also released that the termination of this contract cost the U.S. federal government $20,000, and there was no savings from the termination.
NMFS	$169,782.80	$85,728	DOGE announced the termination of a contract for "non-personal services for aquaculture science tech" for the National Marine Fisheries Service (NMFS).
NMFS	$10,034	$0	DOGE announced the termination of a contract for "snow removal/salt" services for the National Marine Fisheries Service's (NMFS) branch in Falmouth, Massachusetts.
NMFS	$20,160	$0	DOGE announced the termination of a contract for "charter vessel services" for the National Marine Fisheries Service (NMFS) to "capture and tag Chinook salmon".
NMFS	$44,292.50	$950	DOGE announced the termination of a contract for a Northeast Fisheries Science Center, a branch of the National Marine Fisheries Service (NMFS) to "study fleet data collection and reporting services for cooperative research". In the comments regarding this contract's termination, DOGE stated they funded $700 "for whole fish collections".
NMFS	$45,792.64	$1,023.35	DOGE announced the termination of a contract for a Northeast Fisheries Science Center, a branch of the National Marine Fisheries Service (NMFS) to "study fleet data collection and reporting services for cooperative research".
NMFS	$57,181.10	$1,100	DOGE announced the termination of a contract for a Northeast Fisheries Science Center, a branch of the National Marine Fisheries Service (NMFS) to "study fleet data collection and reporting services for cooperative research".
NWS	$60,238.21	$0	DOGE announced the termination of a contract for "two replacement Kaeser compressors" for the National Weather Service Weather Forecasting Office (NWS WFO) in Baltimore/Washington. DOGE stated this contract was terminated on May 14, 2025.
NESDIS	$27,189.40	$20,159.60	DOGE announced the termination of AT&T "cellular service" for the NOAA National Centers for Environmental Information (NCEI) headquarters office in Silver Spring, Maryland. This contract was terminated by a DOGE employee working for the Department of Commerce under the pseudonym "RPRICE".
NWS	$4,370,949.08	$0	On June 3, 2025, DOGE announced the termination of funding for the "program management" of the National Weather Service's Office of Observations. The contract termination notes included it was terminated for being "wasteful spending". DOGE announced this contract was valued at $1,011,966.36 and that the U.S. federal government saved $0 by terminating the contract. According to HigherGov, this contract was actually worth $4,370,949.08, and DOGE paid over $3.35 million just to terminate the contract. DOGE also claimed the contract was "unused funds" as it was an "expired contract". HigherGov released the contract's expiration date was March 31, 2028.
OAR	$250,000	$125,000	DOGE announced the termination of funding for the NOAA Office of Oceanic and Atmospheric Research's (OAR) "CarbonTracker Program" at Harvard University and for "environmental consulting" by Harvard University. DOGE stated this contract was cancelled due to Executive Order 14151, which was signed by President Donald Trump on January 20, 2025.
NESDIS	$3,879,930.61	$1,491,572.96	On June 29, DOGE announced the termination of "cloud costing and data dissemination" for the NOAA Office of Satellite Ground Services (OSGS), a branch of the National Environmental Satellite, Data, and Information Service (NESDIS).
OAR	$4,738,043.16	$985,687.16	On June 29, DOGE announced the termination of funding for the NOAA Earth Systems Integration Board (formerly Weather, Water, and Climate Board), a committee of the NOAA Office of Oceanic and Atmospheric Research's (OAR) based in Silver Spring, Maryland.

=== Grant terminations ===
On April 14, 2025, the Department of Government Efficiency announced that a grant from NOAA to the United States Agency for International Development (USAID) was terminated on March 31, 2025, and that details regarding the grant, including its description and total value were "unavailable".

A month later on May 26, DOGE announced it was terminating the federal grant funding for the Cooperative Institute for Modeling the Earth System (CIMES), one of the 16 cooperative institutes jointly owned and operated by the NOAA Office of Oceanic and Atmospheric Research (OAR) and Princeton University. DOGE announced that three separate grants for CIMES would be terminated on June 30, 2025: one for $45.56 million, a second for $5.18 million, and a third grant whose information was redacted entirely.

=== Lease terminations ===
On March 3, 2025, The Verge and Axios reported leaked information from DOGE saying that NOAA was planning to terminate the building leases for the National Centers for Environmental Prediction's building in College Park, Maryland, which also houses the Environmental Modeling Center and the Weather Prediction Center, and the Radar Operations Center's building on the University of Oklahoma's campus in Norman, Oklahoma. On March 5, M. Scott Carter, the chief political reporter for The Oklahoman, falsely reported "the National Weather Center is among many Oklahoma offices that have been included on a Department of Government Efficiency list of federal buildings to be closed". On March 17, ABC News, reporting from the word of an anonymous NOAA spokesperson, stated the Storm Prediction Center (SPC), located in National Weather Center, was set to be closed by DOGE.

On March 5, 2025, DOGE announced the termination of 19 various NOAA building leases. On March 19, DOGE reinstated two of the leases, leaving only 17 NOAA building leases set to be terminated. On May 3, DOGE reinstated two more leases, leaving only 15 NOAA building leases set to be terminated. On May 26, DOGE reinstated seven more leases, leaving only 8 NOAA building leases set to be terminated. On June 29, DOGE re-terminated one of the leases they reinstated previously, leaving 9 NOAA building leases set to be terminated.

NOAA branch	Location	Annual lease cost	Claimed savings	Description/Notes
NOAA OLE	Seward, Alaska	$22,665	$24,554–24,590	DOGE announced the termination of a 922 square feet (85.7 m^{2}) office space for the NOAA's Fisheries Office of Law Enforcement in Seward, Alaska. On May 3, two months after the lease was terminated, DOGE announced that their savings from the lease being terminated had increased from $24,554 to $24,590, however, the annual lease cost was still $22,665. On May 26, DOGE removed this lease terminations from their list as it was no longer set to be terminated.
MMHRSP	Juneau, Alaska	$20,520	$1,710	DOGE announced the termination of a 1,595 square feet (148.2 m^{2}) office space for Dr. Rachel Dziuba with the NOAA Marine Mammal Health and Stranding Response Program (MMHRSP). On May 26, DOGE removed this lease terminations from their list as it was no longer set to be terminated.
NOAA MNMS	Newport News, Virginia	$17,890	$5,963–6,911	DOGE announced the termination of a 911 square feet (84.6 m^{2}) office space for NOAA in Hampton, Virginia. This was actually a lease termination for the NOAA Monitor National Marine Sanctuary in Newport News, Virginia. On May 3, two months after the lease was terminated, DOGE announced that their savings from the lease being terminated had increased from $5,963 to $6,911, however, the annual lease cost was still $19,793.
NOAA CFLSIO	Seffner, Florida	$21,855	$7,285–7,365	DOGE announced the termination of a 1,525 square feet (141.7 m^{2}) office space for the NOAA's Central Florida Lot Seafood Inspection Office (CFLSIO) in Seffner, Florida. On May 26, DOGE removed this lease terminations from their list as it was no longer set to be terminated. On June 29, DOGE re-terminated this lease, and that by reterminated the lease, DOGE saved $7,365 rather than $7,285.
Air Resources Laboratory's Field Research Division	Idaho Falls, Idaho	$69,756	$488,290	DOGE announced the termination of a 13,681 square feet (1,271.0 m^{2}) office space for NOAA's Air Resources Laboratory's Field Research Division (NOAA ARL) in Idaho Falls, Idaho.
Unknown	Salem, Oregon	$8,040	$670	DOGE announced the termination of a 236 square feet (21.9 m^{2}) office space for NOAA, without listing what branch used the space. However, according to the Department of Commerce, NOAA had no offices in Salem, Oregon. On May 3, DOGE removed this lease terminations from their list as it was no longer set to be terminated.
Unknown	Hilo, Hawaii	$164,391	$150,692	DOGE announced the termination of a 4,638 square feet (430.9 m^{2}) office space for NOAA, without listing what branch used the space.
Unknown	Baton Rouge, Louisiana	$71,102	$59,251	DOGE announced the termination of a 2,400 square feet (220 m^{2}) office space for NOAA, without listing what branch used the space. On March 19, DOGE removed this lease terminations from their list as it was no longer set to be terminated.
NOAA OLE	Salisbury, Maryland	$10,882	$2,720	DOGE announced the termination of a 826 square feet (76.7 m^{2}) office space for NOAA's Fisheries Office of Law Enforcement in Salisbury, Maryland. On May 26, DOGE removed this lease terminations from their list as it was no longer set to be terminated.
Unknown	Northfield, New Jersey	$29,265–29,579	$43,898–46,435	DOGE announced the termination of a 1,035 square feet (96.2 m^{2}) office space for NOAA, without listing what branch used the space. On May 3, two months after the lease was terminated, without any details, DOGE stated the lease's annual cost for the federal government had increased from $29,265 to $29,579 and that DOGE had saved $46,435, rather than $43,898 as reported back on March 5. On May 26, DOGE removed this lease terminations from their list as it was no longer set to be terminated.
Unknown	Port Angeles, Washington	$100,232	$217,169	DOGE announced the termination of a 4,556 square feet (423.3 m^{2}) office space for NOAA, without listing what branch used the space. On May 3, DOGE removed this lease terminations from their list as it was no longer set to be terminated.
NOAA NOS	Key Largo, Florida	$252,011	$1,449,064	DOGE announced the termination of a 7,993 square feet (742.6 m^{2}) office space for the NOAA's Florida Keys National Marine Sanctuary and Eco Discovery Center, a branch of the National Ocean Service, located in Key Largo, Florida.
NOAA OLE	Sunrise, Florida	$51,429–52,972	$77,144–81,562	DOGE announced the termination of a 1,858 square feet (172.6 m^{2}) office space for NOAA's Fisheries Office of Law Enforcement in Sunrise, Florida. On May 3, without any details, DOGE stated the already terminated lease's annual cost had increased from $51,429 to $52,972 and that DOGE had saved an additional $4,418, from the terminated lease's annual cost being increased. On May 26, DOGE removed this lease terminations from their list as it was no longer set to be terminated.
Unknown	Boise, Idaho	$111,448	$27,862–28,091	DOGE announced the termination of a 5,156 square feet (479.0 m^{2}) office space for NOAA, without listing what branch used the space. On June 29, nearly four months after the lease was terminated, DOGE announced that their savings from the lease being terminated had increased from $27,862 to $28,091, however, the annual lease cost for the already terminated contract was still $$111,448.
NOAA ROC	Norman, Oklahoma	$484,325	$4,157,122	DOGE announced the termination of the NOAA Radar Operations Center's 18,743 square feet (1,741.3 m^{2}) building on the University of Oklahoma campus, in Norman, Oklahoma. Information on this termination was leaked to the press two days before the formal release/announcement by DOGE. On March 19, DOGE removed this lease terminations from their list as it was no longer set to be terminated.
Unknown	Narragansett Pier, Rhode Island	$23,937	$197,484	DOGE announced the termination of a 674 square feet (62.6 m^{2}) office space for NOAA, without listing what branch used the space.
NOAA RGA	Barre, Vermont	$9,310–9,369	$12,413–13,245	DOGE announced the termination of a 287 square feet (26.7 m^{2}) office space for NOAA's Regional Geodetic Advisor (RGA) in Barre, Vermont, which serves as the liaison between NOAA and the U.S. National Geodetic Survey. On May 26, nearly three months after the lease was terminated, DOGE announced that their savings from the lease being terminated had increased from $12,413 to $13,245, and that the annual cost for the already terminated lease grew from $9,310 to $9,369.
Unknown	Eureka, California	$19,793	$65,977–66,483	DOGE announced the termination of a 823 square feet (76.5 m^{2}) office space for NOAA in Eureka, California, without listing what branch used the space. According to the NOAA, the only office in Eureka is the National Weather Service's Weather Forecast Office (WFO). The Los Angeles Times reported the office space is an outpost of the National Marine Fisheries Service. On May 3, two months after the lease was terminated, DOGE announced that their savings from the lease being terminated had increased from $65,977 to $66,483, however, the annual lease cost was still $19,793.
NOAA OLE	Wall, New Jersey	$51,262	$179,417	DOGE announced the termination of a 1,768 square feet (164.3 m^{2}) office space for NOAA's Fisheries Office of Law Enforcement in Wall, New Jersey. On May 26, DOGE removed this lease terminations from their list as it was no longer set to be terminated.

== Database and model closures ==
On April 2, 2025, the National Centers for Environmental Information (NCEI), a branch of the NOAA National Environmental Satellite, Data, and Information Service (NESDIS), announced it would be closing and decommissioning several databases and websites. NCEI announced the Shoreline/Coastline Resources page, the Coastal Water Temperature Guide, the Thermal (geothermal) Hot Springs List for the United States, and the Thermal Hot Springs List for the United States would be decommissioned and closed from public access on May 5, 2025. NCEI also announced the United States Earthquake Intensity Database and its sub-databases including the Earthquake Strong Motion Database would be decommissioned also on May 5, 2025. NCEI later announced the Geological History of the World's Oceanic Crust database would be closed on May 12, 2025. Also during April 2025, NCEI announced that all six Regional Climate Center websites would go offline by June 17, 2025, or earlier.

On May 8, NCEI announced it would be closing and retiring the Billion-Dollar Weather and Climate Disasters database.

On June 26, the National Weather Service announced the Environmental Modeling Center would be discontinuing several weather models: the North American Mesoscale Model (NAM), the High Resolution Ensemble Forecast (HREF), the North American Rapid Refresh Ensemble (NARRE), and the High Resolution Window (HiresW), with the exception that HiresW would remain available to the NWS forecasting office in Guam. It was also announced that these models would all be replaced by the Rapid Refresh Forecast System (RRFS). Roger Edwards, a retired employee from the Storm Prediction Center (SPC) stated that "SPC staff who use these models universally deemed this plan a terrible idea harming forecasting" and that the complaints from the SPC staff were "delivered above and ignored".

== 2026 budget proposal ==
In Early-Mid 2025, the United States’ Office of Management and Budget (OMB) released a seven-page proposed budget for NOAA in 2026. The proposed budget was proposed to cut 27.28% of NOAA’s budget in order to "eliminate functions of the Department that are misaligned with the President's agenda and the expressed will of the American people". The proposed budget included a large budget cut from every branch of NOAA, except the National Weather Service (NWS), which would be exactly equal to their previous budget. The Office of Oceanic and Atmospheric Research (OAR) had a 73.86% budget cut proposed, which would "eliminate all funding for climate, weather, and ocean Laboratories and Cooperative Institutes." It also does not fund Regional Climate Data and Information, Climate Competitive Research, Sea Grant (College and Aquaculture), or the National Oceanographic Partnership Program. This includes the complete defunding of the National Severe Storms Laboratory (NSSL) and the Cooperative Institute for Severe and High-Impact Weather Research and Operations (CIWRO), both located at the National Weather Center on the University of Oklahoma campus.

The proposed budget also included directions for NOAA to transfer the National Weather Service’s Space Weather Prediction Center (SWPC) over to the Department of Homeland Security, as the agency "better aligns with DHS's mission to protect critical infrastructure." The proposal continued by saying DHS would "take on the operational mission to predict space weather events and disseminate space weather products and warnings".

=== NCAR dismantling ===
On December 17, 2025, Russell Vought, director of the White House Office of Management and Budget, stated that the National Science Foundation would dismantle the National Center for Atmospheric Research (NCAR). This is part of the battle over climate and climate change research undertaken by Donald Trump's second presidency since January 2025, Mr. Vought being involved in Project 2025 of which this is one component.

== Other changes ==
Webpage replaced by « THIS FILE IS DELETED BY EXECUTIVE ORDER. »

Following Executive Order 14172, signed by President Donald Trump on January 20, 2025, the National Weather Service and other Line Offices changed all maps and products to refer to the Gulf of Mexico as the "Gulf of America", costing untold hours of staff time to make the changes.

In March 2025, amid the 2025 United States government online resource removals, an unknown executive order signed by President Donald Trump resulted in the NOAA Radar Next Program Overview document being removed from NOAA servers. The automated translation of NWS warnings into Spanish has also stopped after the contract expired.

In June 2025, the Department of Defense announced it would no longer provide critical weather data to scientists and forecasters, including to NOAA staff.

== Domestic terrorism threats ==
In May 2025, Veterans on Patrol, a militarized and "violent militia-style group" made public threats to take down all 159 NEXRAD-radar sites across the United States. The NEXRAD sites are jointly owned and operated by the National Weather Service (NWS), the Federal Aviation Administration (FAA) within the Department of Transportation, and the U.S. Air Force within the Department of Defense. NOAA sent an email to all personnel alerting them to the threats. CNN reported the email stated, "this group is advocating for anyone and everyone to join them in conducting penetration drills on NEXRAD sites to identify weaknesses which can be used to ultimately destroy the sites" and that "the group referred to the NEXRAD system towers as 'weather weapons,' and claimed there were no laws preventing American citizens from destroying the 'weapons,'".

== See also ==
- Science policy of the second Donald Trump administration
- Information, science and research under the second Trump administration
- United States federal government targets of Elon Musk
- 2025 United States federal mass layoffs
- Outline of the National Oceanic and Atmospheric Administration
- University of Oklahoma during the second presidency of Donald Trump
- List of weather modification projects in the United States during 2025
