= National Oceanic and Atmospheric Administration Fisheries Office of Law Enforcement =

National Oceanic and Atmospheric Administration Office of Law Enforcement
- NOAA Marine Law Enforcement patch
- Abbreviation: NOAA OLE

Agency overview
- Formed: 1970
- Preceding agency: Division of Law Enforcement, U.S. Fish Commission and Bureau (1930)
- Employees: 200+ (2011)

Jurisdictional structure
- Federal agency: US
- Operations jurisdiction: US
- General nature: Federal law enforcement

Operational structure
- Headquarters: Silver Spring, Maryland
- Agency executives: James Landon, Director; Logan Gregory, Deputy Director; Todd Dubois, Assistant Director; Milena Seelig, Chief, Budget Operations, Management & Information
- Parent agency: National Marine Fisheries Service
- Divisional offices: 5: Northeast; Southeast; Alaska; West Coast; Pacific Islands

Facilities
- Field offices: 52

Website
- http://www.nmfs.noaa.gov/ole/

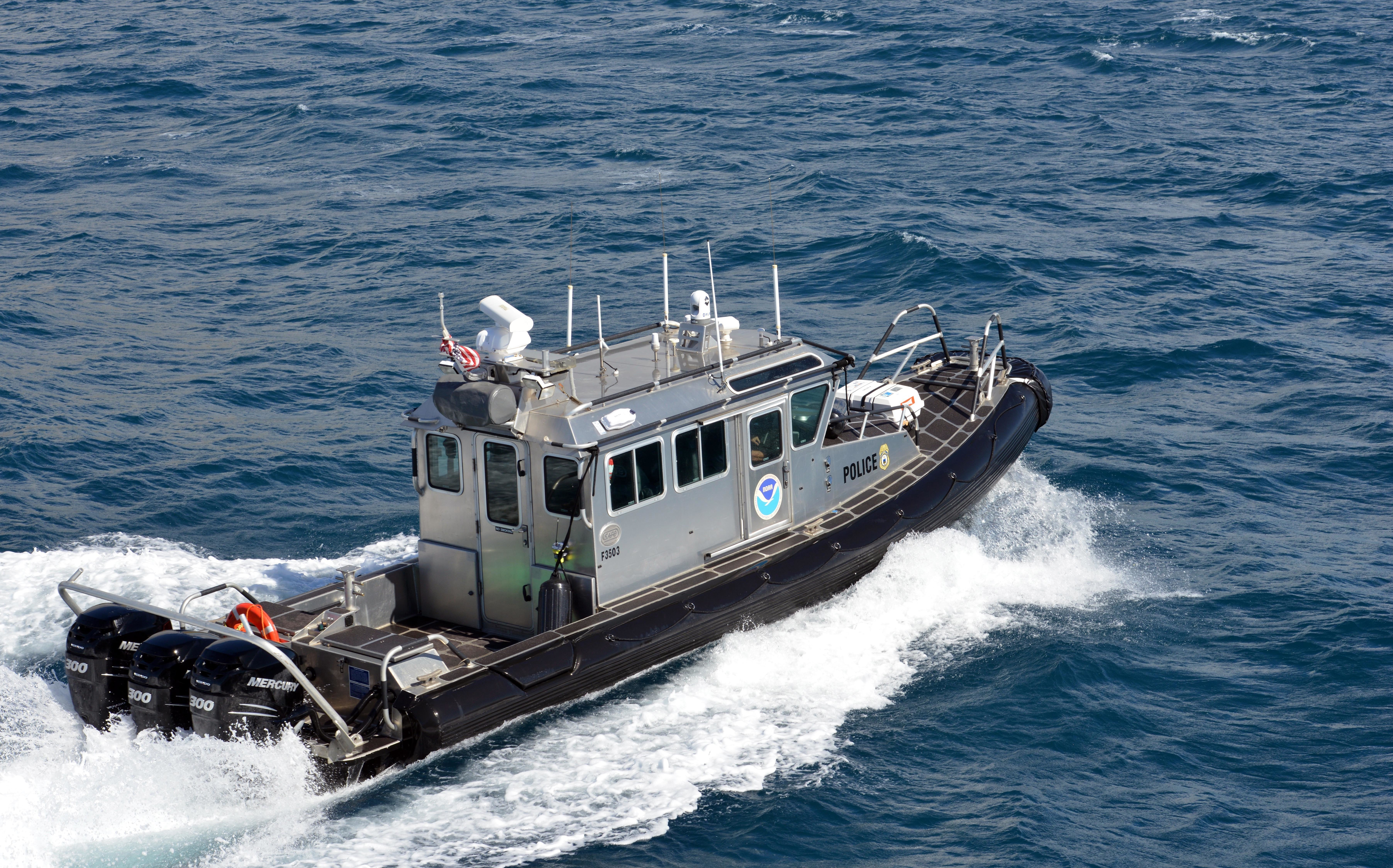
NOAA law enforcement boat patrols offshore during Operation Kohola Guardian in Maui, Hawaii

The National Oceanic and Atmospheric Administration Fisheries Office of Law Enforcement (NOAA OLE) is a federal police part of the National Marine Fisheries Service of the National Oceanic and Atmospheric Administration, headquartered in Silver Spring, Maryland. The leadership consists of Director James Binniker, and Deputy Director Manny Antonaras

It was established in 1930 as the Division of Law Enforcement, U.S. Fish Commission and Bureau. It is responsible for the ecosystem protection and conservation of most of national marine life. It is the only federal agency for such purposes. As of 2011, it has more than 200 employees. NOAA OLE is divided into five divisional offices (Northeast, Southeast, Alaska, West Coast, and Pacific Islands), led by an Assistant Director, and 52 field offices, e.g., Pago Pago, American Samoa; Ellsworth, Maine; and San Juan, Puerto Rico.

In March 2025, the leases for several field offices were terminated.

== State partners ==
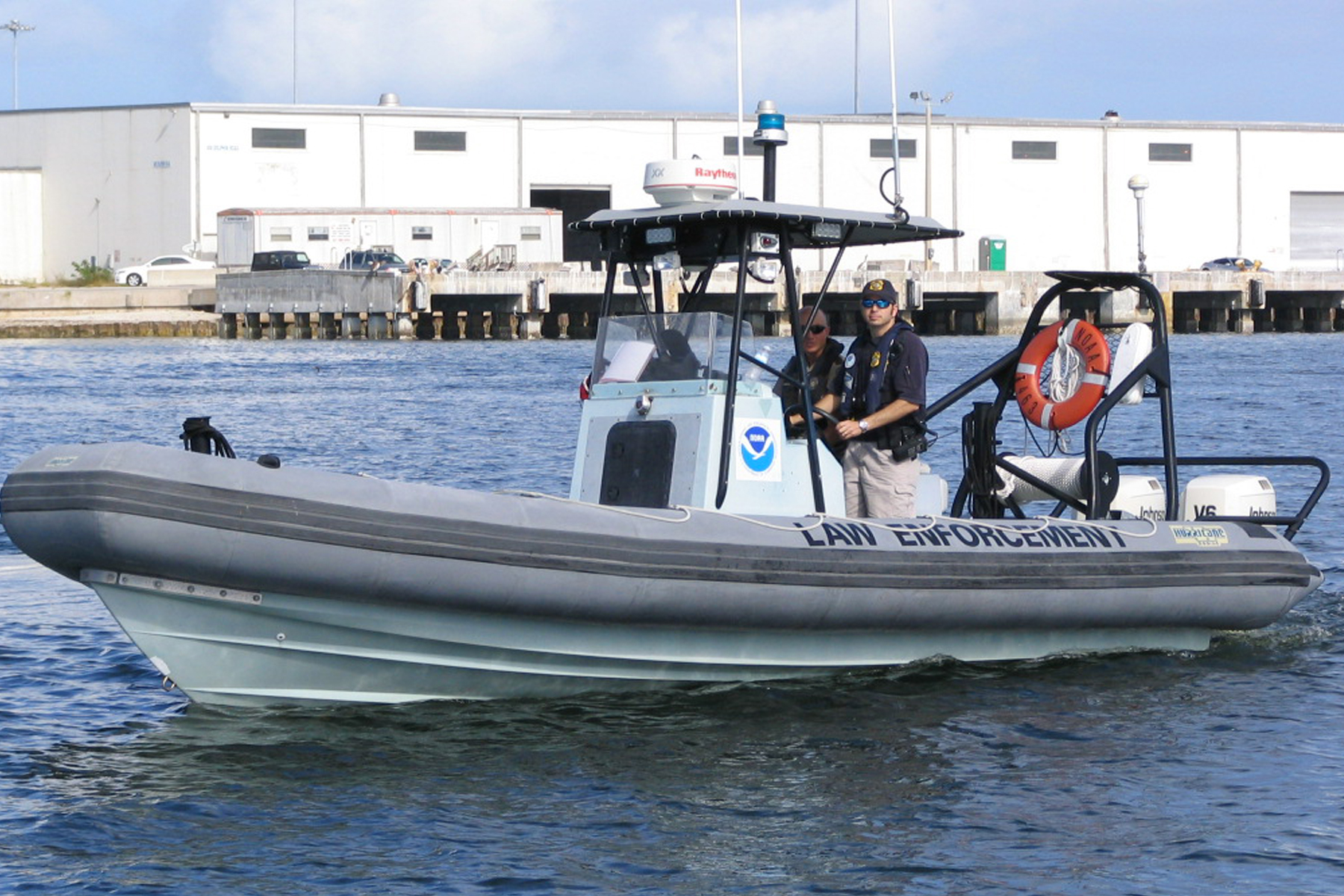
NOAA OLE patrol boat working with local law enforcement

OLE maintains working relationships with state agencies under Cooperative Enforcement Agreements (CEAs). Partners include:

Alabama, Alaska, American Samoa, California, the Commonwealth of Northern Marianas, Delaware, Connecticut, Florida, Georgia, Guam, Hawaii, Louisiana, Maine, Maryland, Massachusetts, Mississippi, New Hampshire, New Jersey, New York, Oregon, Rhode Island, South Carolina, Texas, Virginia, and Washington.

== Laws and statutes enforced ==
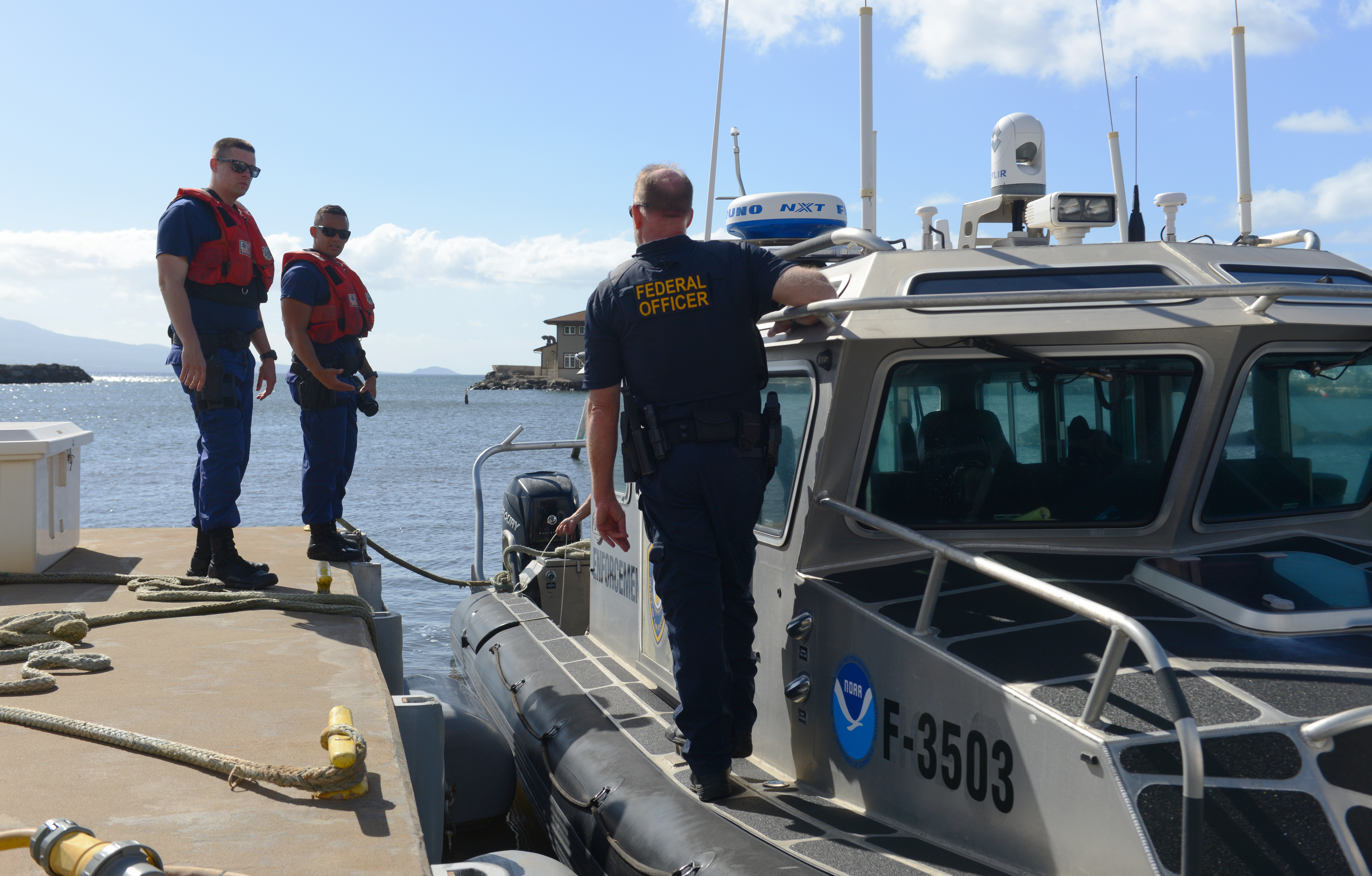
Coast Guard sailors greet a NOAA federal officer aboard his NOAA patrol boat

- The Magnuson-Stevens Fishery Conservation and Management Act (MSFCMA) (16 U.S.C. 1801)
- Sustainable Fisheries Act of 1996
- High Seas Driftnet Act of 1992 (16 U.S.C. 18269)
- The Endangered Species Act of 1973 (ESA) (16 U.S.C. 1531)
- The Marine Mammal Protection Act of 1972 (MMPA) (16 U.S.C. 1361)
- The Lacey Act Amendments of 1983 (Lacey) (16 U.S.C. 3371)
- The Marine Sanctuaries Act (NMSA) (16 U.S.C. 1431)
- Florida Keys National Marine Sanctuary and Protection Act
- American Fisheries Act of 1998 (Public Law 105-277)
- Certificate of Legal Origin for Anadromous Fish Products (16 U.S.C. 1822 note, Section 801 (f)
- Antarctic Conservation Act of 1978 (16 U.S.C. 2401-2413)
- Antarctic Marine Living Resources Convention Act of 1984 (16 U.S.C. 2431-2444)
- Antarctic Protection Act of 1990 (16 U.S.C. 2465[a])
- Atlantic Coastal Fisheries Cooperative Management Act (16 U.S.C. 5103[b])
- Atlantic Tunas Convention Act of 1975 (16 U.S.C. 971-971k)
- Atlantic Salmon Convention Act of 1982 (16 U.S.C. 3601-3608)
- Atlantic Striped Bass Conservation Act of 1984 (16 U.S.C. 1851 note)
- Deep Seabed Hard Mineral Resources Act of 1980 (30 U.S.C. 1401 et seq)
- Dolphin Protection Consumer Information Act (16 U.S.C. 1385 et seq)
- Driftnet Impact Monitoring, Assessment and Control Act (16 U.S.C. 1822 note section 4006)
- Eastern Pacific Tuna Licensing Agreement Act of 1984 (16 U.S.C. 972-972h)
- Fish and Seafood Promotion Act (16 U.S.C. 4001-4017)
- Fisherman's Protective Act of 1967 (22 U.S.C. 1980[g])
- Fur Seal Act Amendments of 1983 (16 U.S.C. 1151-1175)
- High Seas Fishing Compliance Act (16 U.S.C. 5506[a])
- Land Remote-Sensing Policy Act of 1992 (15 U.S.C. 5601 et seq)
- Northern Pacific Anadromous Stocks Convention Act of 1992 (16 U.S.C. 5001-5012)
- Northern Pacific Halibut Act of 1982 (16 U.S.C. 773-773k)
- Ocean Thermal Energy Conservation Act of 1980 (42 U.S.C. 9101 et seq)
- Pacific Salmon Treaty Act of 1985 (16 U.S.C 3631-3644)
- Shark Finning Prohibition Act (16 U.S.C. 1822).
- South Pacific Tuna Act of 1988 (16 U.S.C. 3631-3644)
- Sponge Act of 1906 (16 U.S.C. 781 et seq)
- Tuna Convention Act of 1950 (15 U.S.C. 951-961)
- Weather Modifications Reporting Act (15 U.S.C. 330-330e)
- Whaling Convention Act of 1949 (16 U.S.C. 916-916l)

== See also ==
- List of United States federal law enforcement agencies
- CITES (Convention on International Trade in Endangered Species of Wild Fauna and Flora)
- United States Fish and Wildlife Service
  - United States Fish and Wildlife Service Office of Law Enforcement
- U.S. Coast Guard
  - Coast Guard Investigative Service
