= Uncrewed Systems Research Transition Office =

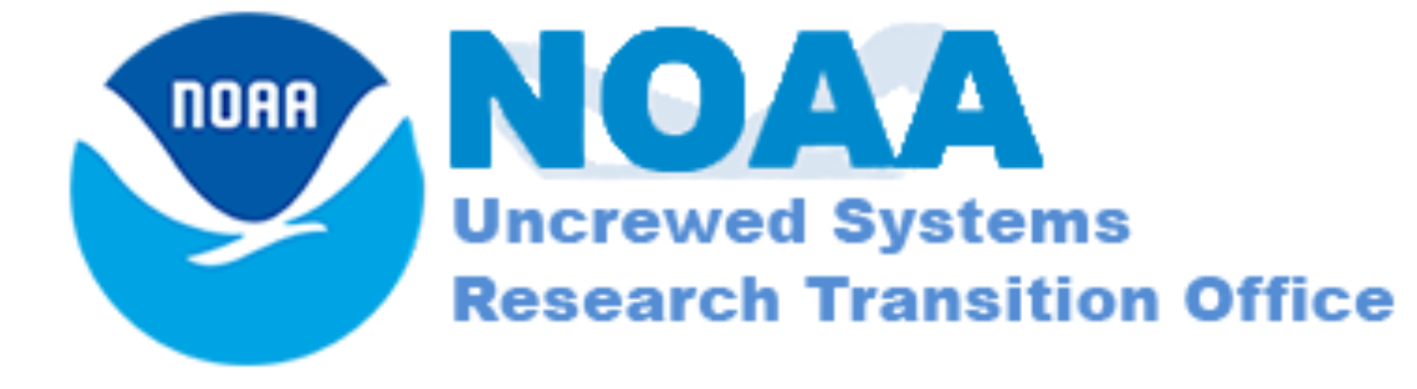
- Abbreviation: UxSRTO
- Founded: 2005
- Dissolved: 2024
- Purpose: Research
- Headquarters: Silver Spring, Maryland, U.S.
- Parent organization: Office of Oceanic and Atmospheric Research

The Uncrewed Systems Research Transition Office (UxSRTO) was an agency of the United States federal government, tasked with collecting meteorological and environmental data using unmanned aerial vehicles, before it was shut down in March 2024. It was a branch of the Office of Oceanic and Atmospheric Research (OAR), a division of the National Oceanic and Atmospheric Administration (NOAA). The stated goal of the Uncrewed Systems Research Transition Office was "to realize this potential by working with NOAA Line Offices, Federal Agencies, and other stakeholders to advance and enhance UxS application across the breadth of NOAA’s mission areas of climate, weather, oceans, and coasts."

== History ==
In June 2023, NOAA announced it was allocating $6.4 million in funding for the UxSRTO and Uncrewed Systems Operations Center (UxSOC).

In July 2023, NOAA's UxSRTO reported they had found "no significant impact for the funding, procurement, and operation of NOAA small uncrewed aircraft systems", and the UxSRTO program was shut down by the OAR in March 2024. In February 2025, the Department of Government Efficiency (DOGE) advised NOAA to terminate and deobligate $1,073,496 of funds from the UxSRTO.
