= List of weather modification projects in the United States during 2025 =

This is a list of weather modification projects in the United States in 2025. In the United States, the National Oceanic and Atmospheric Administration (NOAA) keeps records of weather modification projects on behalf of the Secretary of Commerce, under the authority of Public Law 92-205, 15 USC § 330B, enacted in 1971. During 2025, five weather modification projects have been authorized and documented.

== List ==
Project number	Modifier	Start date	End date	Details
2025TXGU-1	Rainmaker Technology Corporation (CEO Augustus Doricko)	January 24	December 27	"Project Precipitation Enhancement" by the Rainmaker Technology Corporation has the goal to increase rainfall across 1,236 square miles (3,200 km^{2}) of the Gulf of Mexico coastline by "dispersing charged water droplets into warm stratocumulus and cumulus clouds to seed warm droplet formation". This will be done by "dispersing less than 500 gallons of water over the course of greater than 1 hour flights travelling at greater than 80 knots". NOAA also published Rainmaker Technology Corporation did not submit a potential Environmental Impact Statement of their weather modification project.
2025TXST-1	Rainmaker Technology Corporation	March 5	November 29	"Project South Texas Weather Modification Association" by the Rainmaker Technology Corporation has the goal to increase rainfall across 10,830 square miles (10,830 sq mi) of the South Texas region. NOAA also published Rainmaker Technology Corporation did not submit a potential Environmental Impact Statement of their weather modification project. Cloud seeding during the project became widely known and criticized, following conspiracy theories that "Project South Texas Weather Modification Association" was the cause of the deadly and historic July 2025 Central Texas floods. Shortly after the flood, Georgia congresswoman Marjorie Taylor Greene introduced a bill to make weather modification a felony, specifically targeting the projects by Rainmaker Technology Corporation.
2025TXTP-1	Rainmaker Technology Corporation	March 15	October 31	"Project Trans-Pecos Weather Modifciation [sic] Association" by the Rainmaker Technology Corporation has the goal to increase rainfall and suppress hail across the Trans-Pecos region of Texas. NOAA also published Rainmaker Technology Corporation did not submit a potential Environmental Impact Statement of their weather modification project.
2025TXWT-1	Rainmaker Technology Corporation	March 15	October 31	"Project West Texas Weather Modification" by the Rainmaker Technology Corporation has the goal to increase rainfall and suppress hail across the region from San Angelo to Midland in Texas. NOAA also published Rainmaker Technology Corporation did not submit a potential Environmental Impact Statement of their weather modification project.
2025TXTPH-1	Meteorologist Corey Clay	April 1	September 30	"Project Panhandle Groundwater Conservation District" by meteorologist Corey Clay has the goal to increase rainfall across eight counties of the Texas panhandle (Carson, Gray, Wheeler, Armstrong, Donley, Roberts, Potter, and Hutchinson). The project involves "a single and twin engine aircraft equipped with flare racks". The project involves flares filled with 40g glaciogenic (5.5g of silver iodide (AgI)) and both 500g and 1kg hygroscopic calcium chloride (CaCl_{2}), and the "dosaging can range from 1 flare per cloud upwards to 20 flares per cloud, depending on the size and characteristics of the cloud". NOAA released that Corey Clay would be using the National Weather Service's TITAN radar during the project to monitor the modification.

== See also ==
- NOAA under the second presidency of Donald Trump
- Misinformation about the 2024 Atlantic hurricane season
