= United States government online resource removals under the second Trump administration =

Beginning in January 2025, a series of web page and dataset deletions and modifications across multiple United States federal agencies have been made. Immediately following executive orders from President Donald Trump's administration, government organizations removed or modified over 8,000 web pages and approximately 3,000 datasets. The changes primarily affected content related to diversity, equity, and inclusion (DEI) initiatives, gender identity, public health research, environmental policy, and various social programs, and other topics Trump and the Republican Party have expressed opposition to. Major affected agencies included the Centers for Disease Control and Prevention, which saw over 3,000 pages altered or removed, and the Census Bureau, which removed about 3,000 pages of research materials. While some content was later restored, the modifications represented significant changes to federal government data accessibility and sparked legal challenges from healthcare advocacy groups.

== Background ==
Agencies of the United States government share open data for many uses. There are many civic technology, research, and business applications which rely on access to government data. Dataset deletion can, at times, be useful for maintenance; though it can equally result from poor archival practices. There is little government regulation on dataset management, so it can be challenging to determine when content deletions occur. Determining the reasons for removals and their significance is also difficult. All administrations make modifications to public websites, but there is little research on how much change is typical. There has been past speculation that previous government changes would result in removed access to data, but those removals did not happen.

In 2009, Data.gov was established to improve public access to high value, machine-readable datasets generated by the Executive Branch of the Federal Government. In 2019, the OPEN Government Data Act ordered agencies to share data that could be used to evaluate the effectiveness of their programs and to guide policymaking. Various federal agencies release data on their own websites.

In 2019, Trump signed into law the Foundation for Evidence-Based Policymaking Act, which established a system for utilizing data to construct evidence-based policy. Trump's second administration showed a dramatic pivot from this law passed during his first administration.

In late January 2025, organizations under the Department of Health and Human Services (HHS) paused their external communication during a review.

== Removed and modified content ==
On January 29, 2025, the Office of Personnel Management (OPM) ordered agencies to comply with President Trump's executive order, "Defending Women," which requires federal agencies to "recognize women are biologically female, and men are biologically male". The organizations were told to terminate any programs and remove any outward facing media, documents, materials, communications, and statements that promote "gender ideology" by January 31.

Agencies also moved quickly to comply with the executive order "Ending Radical Government DEI Programs" by removing forbidden terms from their websites. Census.gov went offline as it attempted to comply with the executive orders "Reevaluating Foreign Aid" and "Defending Women". The information removals and modifications reflected policy changes championed by the Donald Trump 2024 presidential campaign.

Data removal included topics related to DEI (diversity, equity, and inclusion), long COVID, HIV/AIDS, vaccines, transgender and gender identity-related topics, foreign aid, environmental justice, emergency management, employment, and the January 6 United States Capitol attack. By February 2, 2025, the content removal included more than 8,000 web pages across more than a dozen government websites. According to The New York Times, the removed pages made up approximately 0.1% of all U.S. government web pages.

Some web pages and documents remain accessible, but were stripped of terminology relating to the prohibited topics. Terms have been replaced across many government web pages; "climate change" was often replaced by "climate resilience", "LGBTQ" replaced by "LGB", and "pregnant people" replaced by "pregnant women". According to The Washington Post, the most common change to web pages was removing DEI-related terms. The website modifications also affected older web pages, such as the description of a 2021 conference and a 2022 letter from cabinet secretaries. The Washington Post reported that some pages seemed to be mistakenly modified; the word "diverse" was removed from a page describing the extent of the Department of the Interior's museum collection.

=== CDC website ===
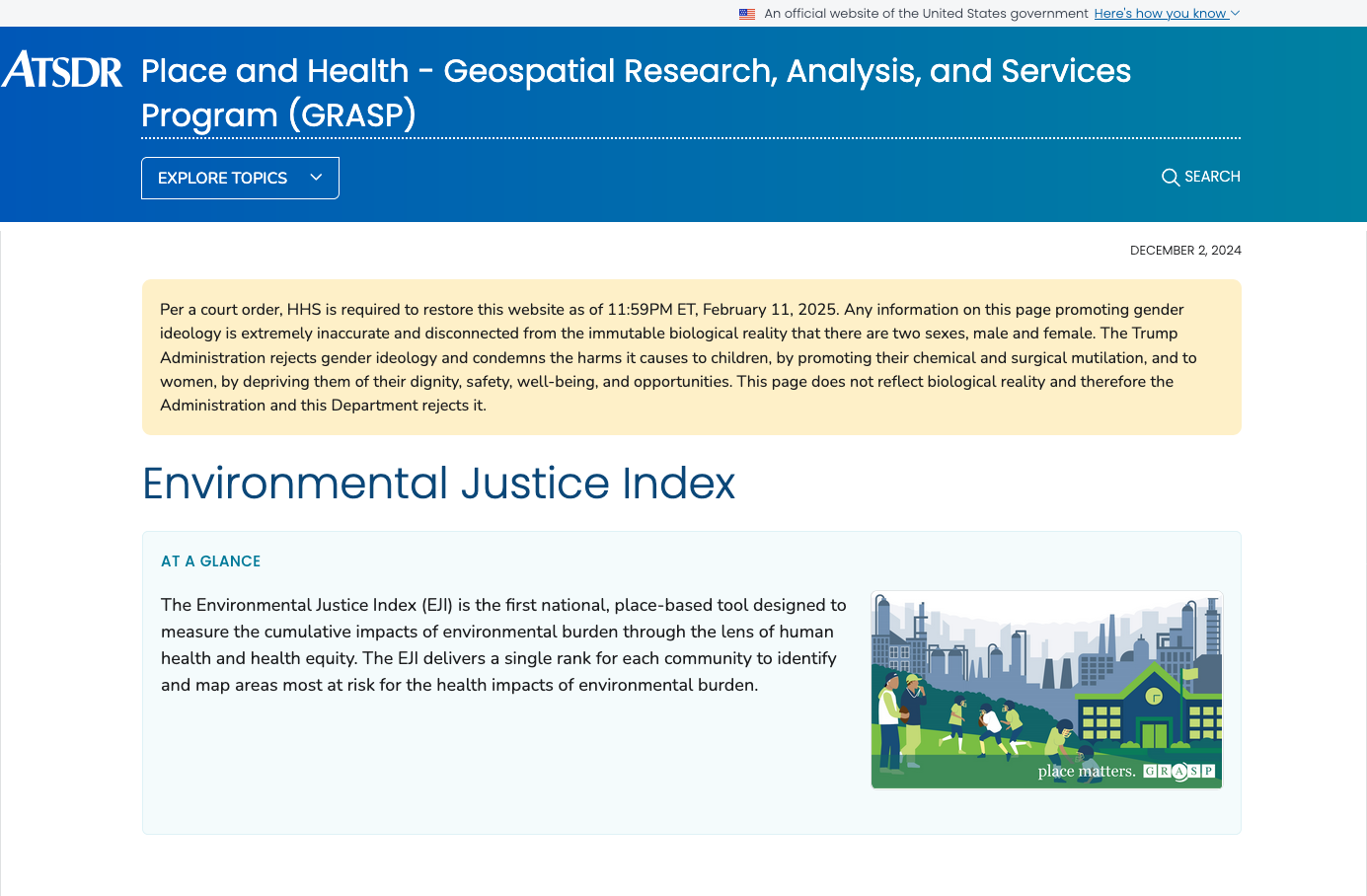
Screenshot of the CDC Environmental Justice Index website with a warning that "any information on this page promoting gender ideology is extremely inaccurate"

As of February 2, more than 3,000 pages from the website for the Centers for Disease Control and Prevention have been altered or removed. This included thousands of research papers relating to chronic medical conditions, sexually transmitted infections, Alzheimer's disease, drug overdose prevention, adolescent health, and reproductive care.

Vaccine guidelines for pregnant people were also removed from the CDC website, which The New York Times noted may have been due to use of the gender-neutral term "pregnant people." One employee said that since HIV-related webpages commonly referenced gender, they had to "take everything down in order to meet the deadline". Some data was restored later, such as the Atlas Tool for tracking infectious diseases such as HIV and STIs and information on the Youth Risk Behavior Surveillance System. As of February 6, 2025, the CDC website maintained a notice stating that "CDC's website is being modified to comply with President Trump's Executive Orders".

A January 2026 study found that among CDC datasets that had previously been updated monthly, 46% had unexplained pauses in updates, the majority of which related to data on vaccinations or impacts of common respiratory viruses.

=== Science and research websites ===
NOAA webpage that was replaced by "THIS FILE IS DELETED BY EXECUTIVE ORDER."

In January, NASA undertook a comprehensive removal of DEI-related content from its public-facing websites. An internal directive instructed employees to "drop everything" and immediately eliminate references to terms such as "DEIA", "indigenous people", "environmental justice", "underrepresented groups/people", and content specifically targeting women, including content about "women in leadership". This purge resulted in the deletion of various materials, including interviews with Black and female NASA employees, LGBTQ-related content, and two NASA-created comic books about women astronauts.

More than 3,000 pages from the Census Bureau website had been removed as of February 2 2025, primarily articles filed under research and methodology. Pages relating to data stewardship as well as survey and data set documentation were also removed.

The Food and Drug Administration (FDA) had removed more than 100 pages as of February 2, including dozens of regulatory guidelines on topics such as increasing diversity in clinical trials and the potential for addiction and abuse in drug studies.

Close to 50 research papers from the Office of Scientific and Technical Information – part of the Department of Energy – were removed as of February 2. The removed papers covered a range of subjects, such as chemistry, optics, and experimental medicine.

Twenty pages from the National Institute of Standards and Technology (NIST) website were removed as of February 2, including a page documenting the organization's zero-tolerance harassment policy. The environmental justice mapping and screening tool EJScreen was removed from the Environment Protection Agency (EPA) on February 5, along several related pages. Public Environmental Data Project (PEDP) published a reconstruction of one of its earlier versions. In March 2025, an unknown executive order signed by President Donald Trump resulted in the NOAA Radar Next Program Overview document being removed from NOAA servers.

The NOAA maintains a list of resources and products it retires. On May 31, the entire climate.gov team was fired, likely shutting down the site. The National Climate Assessment reports, congressionally mandated under the Global Change Research Act of 1990, were taken offline, and the 400 scientists working on the 2027 assessment were fired.

=== Justice and crime websites ===
The Department of Justice (DOJ) removed over 180 pages as of February 2, including all state-level crime data and seven pages with information on anti-LGBTQ hate crimes. At least 1,000 pages from the Office of Justice Programs, a crime prevention research organization, were removed as of February 2. This included information on teen relationship violence, and a blog post regarding grants directed toward combating hate crimes. The Marshals Service saw two pages removed, relating to correctional facility standards and fitness readiness requirements. The National Law Enforcement Accountability Database, which tracked federal police officer misconduct, was removed as of February 20. In March, the DOJ deleted a study showing that undocumented immigrants commit less crime than American citizens.

In September 2025, a study conducted by the National Institute of Justice was deleted which showed that white supremacist and far-right violence were the most common forms of terrorism and domestic violent extremism in the United States. The Not One More report on missing, murdered, and disappeared Native Americans was removed from the DOJ's website in February 2025; the administration said that the report, mandated by Congress by the Not Invisible Act, was pulled to ensure compliance with one of Trump's recent executive orders.

=== Healthcare and social services websites ===
Head Start, a U.S. federal aid program for low-income childcare, had over 200 pages removed as of February 2, including advice on establishing familial routines and guidance to help prevent postpartum depression. The removals followed a freeze of federal funds to the program days earlier.

As of February 2, nearly 150 pages had been removed from the Substance Abuse and Mental Health Services Administration website. This included more than 50 press releases about using a helpline following shootings or natural disasters. The Health Resources and Services Administration deleted 18 pages from their website as of February 2, including information on the mpox vaccine and opioid addiction among women. Three pages from the Department of Veterans Affairs were removed as of February 2, including information on healthcare for minority and LGBTQ veterans, as well as the equity of the Southeast Louisiana Veterans Health Care System. ReproductiveRights.gov, an HHS website providing information on reproductive care, was taken offline. The website was launched by the Biden administration following the overruling of Roe v. Wade.

On February 13, Garey Rice, the principal deputy assistant secretary for operations at HHS, declared that DOGE employees grafted to the agency have "full access to all unclassified agency records and software and IT systems" and are tasked, among other things, with the obligation to "destroy or erase copied HHS data or information when no longer needed for official purposes."

As of April 4, 2025, over 20 National Institutes of Health (NIH) data repositories displayed headers stating "This repository is under review for potential modification in compliance with Administration directives." These repositories contain petabytes of data that are used for public health research in diverse areas, including cancer, brain imaging, sleep studies, Alzheimer's, aging, COVID-19, and HIV. Many of the datasets cannot be archived by outside researchers because they are regulated by Data Use Agreements that must be consistent with the Health Insurance Portability and Accountability Act (HIPAA). In April 2025, the Trump administration removed the online hub for federal COVID-19 resources, including COVID.gov and COVIDtests.gov, replacing it with a landing page promoting the COVID-19 lab leak theory.

=== Other websites ===
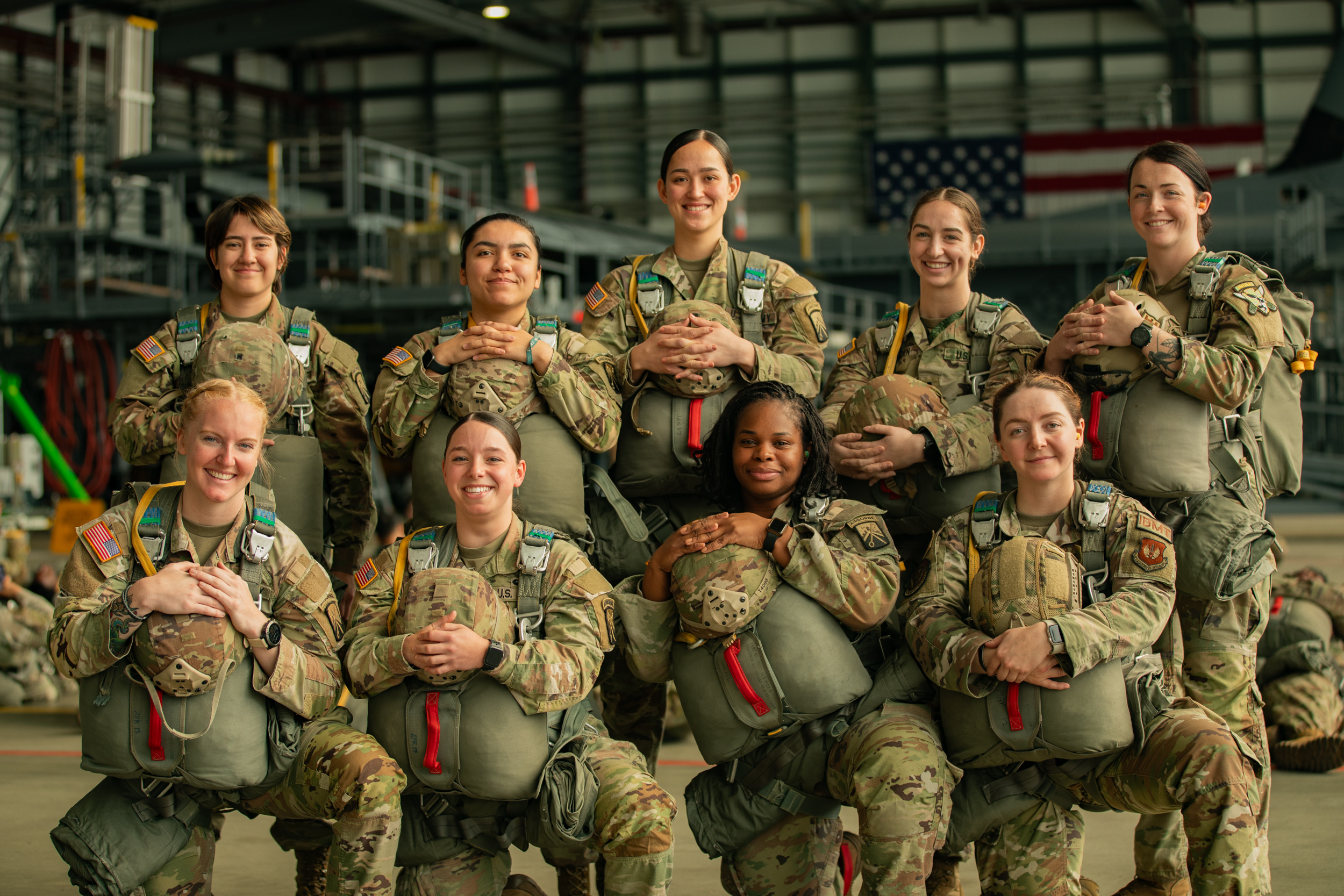
Example of image removed on Defense Visual Information Distribution Service

"Pride Month: The military is a melting pot of diversity", a video removed from DVIDS

The Internal Revenue Service removed more than 25 pages as of February 2, including a form that private schools are required to submit annually to certify that they had not engaged in racial discrimination. The Consumer Financial Protection Bureau (CFPB) removed 386 videos from its official YouTube channel.

As of February 2, there were 18 pages removed from the United States Patent and Trademark Office website, including information about veteran inventors and entrepreneurs, and a high school program teaching about intellectual property.

The Department of the Interior removed eight pages from their website as of February 2, including several with information on environmental policy initiatives. The New York Times speculated that some of the pages may have been removed due to the use of the phrase "environmental justice". The National Park Service removed all references to the existence of transgender people from its webpages covering the Stonewall National Monument, the Stonewall riots, and LGBTQ+ history, changing the acronym from "LGBTQ+" to "LGB".

As of February 3, four pages from the Nuclear Regulatory Commission have been deleted, including an overview of the commission's equal employment opportunity and diversity initiatives.

The FDA's Office of Minority Health and Health Equity website was removed, and the NIH's Office of Equity, Diversity and Inclusion website now redirects to an equal employment opportunity web page.

All Spanish-language content on whitehouse.gov was removed, as it was following President Trump's first inauguration. The Association of Academies of the Spanish Language issued a joint statement criticizing the removal, noting the importance of Spanish as the second most spoken language in the United States, especially in Puerto Rico. Signatories included the North American and Puerto Rican Academies of the Spanish Language.

International travel advisories on the Department of State website replaced their language on "LGBTQ+ Travelers" with language around "LGB Travelers" and removed reference to safety and other issues faced by transgender Americans in other countries.

Thousand of images were reported flagged for removal by the Defense Department. Arlington National Cemetery removed dozens of pages from its website. Some identified gravesites of notable Black, Hispanic and female service members, and others included educational material.

On March 18, more than 300 posts were removed from the FTC business guidance blogs, including those reporting on lawsuits by Lina Khan against the tech giants.

On April 6, 2025, The Washington Post reported that the National Park Service had revised a web page about the Underground Railroad to remove a quote and image of Harriet Tubman, and to remove the word "slavery" from the opening paragraph. Following an outcry after widespread reporting of the revisions, the changes were reverted the following day. A spokesperson for the National Park Service stated that changes to the web page "were made without approval from NPS leadership nor Department leadership". In August 2025, the government website for the Constitution of the United States was modified, removing large parts of Section 8 and entirely deleting Sections 9 and 10 from Article 1 of the document. On August 6, the Library of Congress said the deletion of text was "due to a coding error", and was working to correct the issue.

As of November 2025, the USDA has deleted its contingency plan to fund SNAP.

In July 2026, the Department of Energy deleted 6,000 pages related to energy conservation amidst the 2026 North American heat wave.

=== Datasets ===
In January 2025, the government removed about 3,000 datasets from various platforms. Many deleted datasets came from the Department of Energy, the National Oceanic and Atmospheric Administration, and the Environmental Protection Agency.

Affected datasets
Dataset	Description	Organization	Notes
Behavioral Risk Factor Surveillance System	widely used national health survey	Centers for Disease Control	
Youth Risk Behavior Surveillance System	high school student social determinants of health	CDC	
CDC AtlasPlus	HIV, viral hepatitis, STI, and TB, social determinants of health	CDC	
PEPFAR Dashboard	PEPFAR programs	Department of State, Global AIDS Coordinator	
Demographic and Health Surveys	population, health, HIV, and nutrition data from many countries	USAID, ICF International	
foreignassistance.gov	foreign aid data by country, budget, expenditure, program	Department of State, Agency for International Development	
Household Pulse Survey	long COVID	CDC	
Social Vulnerability Index	Relative deprivation	CDC	
Environmental Justice Index	Identifies areas "most at risk for the health impacts of environmental burden."	CDC	
Employment Situation	Unemployment in the United States	Bureau of Labor Statistics	
Federal criminal charge records	January 6 United States Capitol attack	United States Department of Justice	
The World Factbook	geographical general reference data	Central Intelligence Agency	

== Legal responses ==
Doctors for America sued the U.S. government to restore health information, arguing "The removal of this information deprives researchers of access to information that is necessary for treating patients ... and for developing practices and policies that protect the health of vulnerable populations and the country as a whole." In response, a federal judge issued a temporary restraining order on February 11, 2025, requiring certain websites from the Department of Health and Human Services, the CDC, and the FDA to be restored.

American Federation of Teachers and Minority Veterans of America and Public Citizen Litigation Group also filed lawsuits.

== Reactions ==
Representatives from the Population Association of America, the Council of Professional Associations on Federal Statistics, and the Association of Public Data Users (APDU) expressed disapproval of the data deletion. President of the APDU, Amy O'Hara, described a "mad scramble" as researchers searched for copies of the deleted data.

Former US Department of Labor chief evaluation officer and board member of Data Foundation Molly Irwin warned of the dangers of deleting critical government data. She said government data is a critical component of how politicians and analysts evaluate whether a particular policy is working as intended.

The stock market, bond market, and Federal Reserve all continuously make decisions based on labor data. This data is typically stable, but changes to it reduce confidence in data about the economy. Uncertainty also encourages conspiracy theories which view government data as intentionally incorrect for malicious purposes. Furthermore, businesses rely on the essentially free government data as a part of their own operations, planning, products and services. Zillow, for example, utilizes government data to generate their product of real estate information and analysis.

Scientists reacted by saying that they would restore access to some data, but doing so is not easy. The Internet Archive has been successful in archiving many health datasets. Internet Archive is also a contributor to the consortium effort of developing the End of Term Web Archive, which attempts to copy every government publication at the end of every presidential term. Organizations like IPUMS, which provides data curation, integration, harmonization, is serving as an important source for previously deleted data.

The Harvard Law School Library hosts the Data.gov Archive. The Chan School mirrored public health records. The law library's Innovation Lab said that it had managed to preserve 311,000 datasets copied between 2024 and 2025. A coalition of data organizations launched the Data Rescue Project "as a clearinghouse for data rescue-related efforts".

George Benjamin, head of the American Public Health Association, said that the removals could make it more difficult to track infectious diseases such as HIV and Mpox. He also expressed concern that even if the data was restored, new data might not be collected which would impair future research.

Director of the National Institutes of Health (NIH) Executive Secretariat, Nate Brought, said that Trump's orders were in conflict with extensive research and conclusions by the NIH pertaining to sexuality and gender. In a letter to the NIH director and other senior officials, Brought urged them to refuse implementing the President's directives.

Groups like Free Government Information have voiced strong dissent over the removals, and have started organizing efforts to collect and preserve federal government data. Similarly, the Preservation of Electronic Government Information (PEGI) group has voiced similar urgency to collect and save data before they are removed from official government sites. Grassroots collective efforts such as the Data Rescue Project have launched efforts to coordinate these various data preservation endeavors.
