= EJScreen =

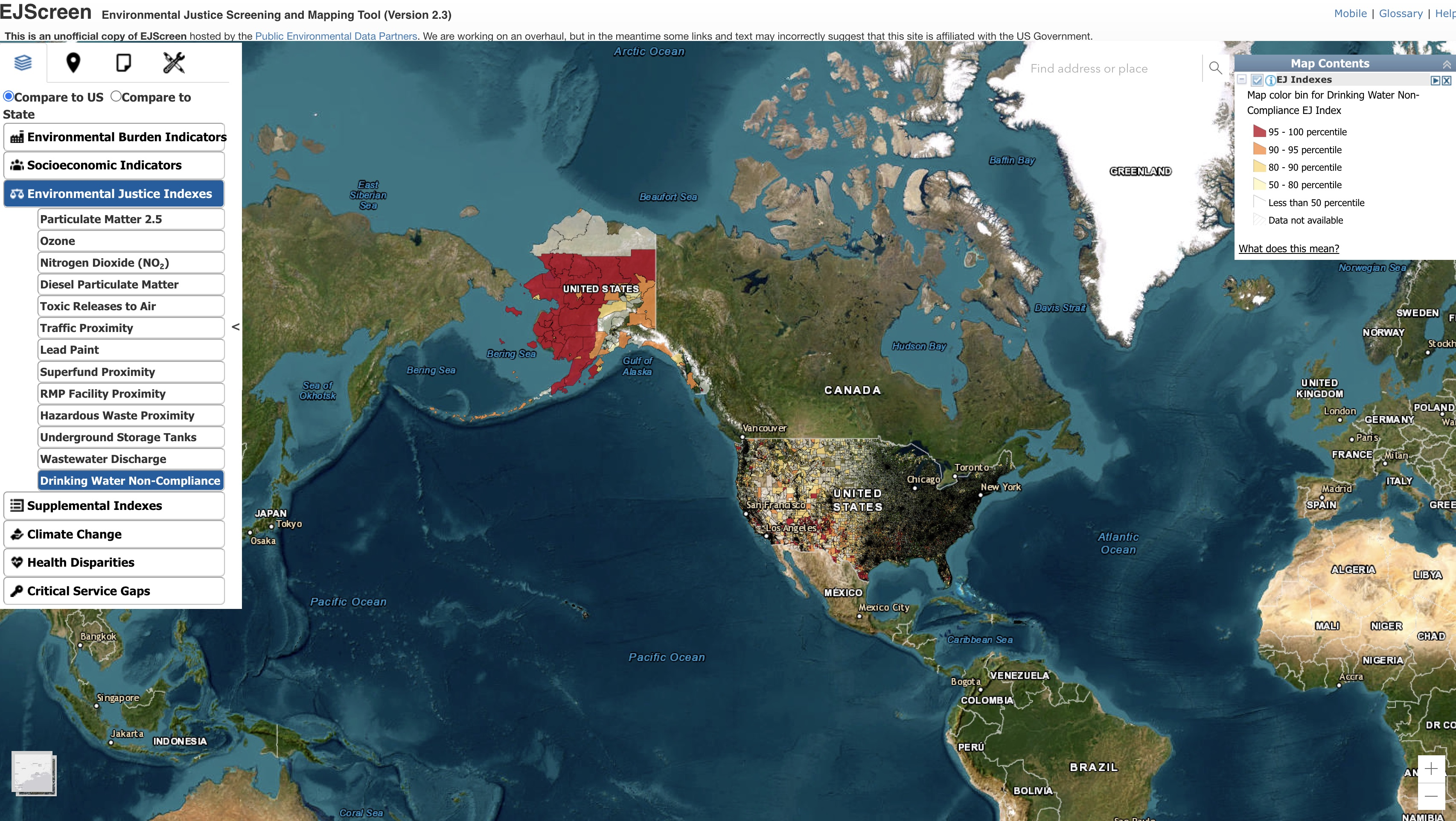
Displays the assessment of Drinking Water Non-Compliance in the United States. The redder the color, the higher the percentage of the environmental justice index.

EJScreen, the Environmental Justice Screening and Mapping Tool, is a free and public online screening and mapping tool that contains environmental and demographic data on different areas of the United States. It is an online GIS (Geographic Information System) tool that uses different environmental indicators and combines them individually with demographic information to display an ecological justice index for which communities contribute most to national disparities and may face higher environmental burdens and social vulnerability. It uses publicly available data from sources such as the American Community Survey (ACS) and National Air Toxics Assessment. The tool provides interactive mapping which helps users visualize data down to the census block group level along with indexes to help generate customer reports and exploring state, county, and city-level and country-level trends. This tool helps identify areas disproportionately exposed to environmental hazards and issues. Another purpose of this tool is to support policy decisions, community advocacy, and research on environmental equity. The EJScreen tool was able to direct new environmental initiatives and projects that could be geared towards improving environmental health without causing further environmental hazards to certain demographics or communities. In July 2024, the EPA website updated the EJScreen tool to version 2.3, this included the Underground Storage Tank (UST) Finder, which is able to document active UST's or communities that have UST's.

== History ==
The Environmental Justice Movement gained momentum in the 1970s-1990s, which was fueled by findings that low-income and minority communities were more likely to be exposed to environmental hazards such as landfills and industrial sites. The EJScreen became available to the public after being peer reviewed, but initially started to be developed in 2010. In 1994, President Bill Clinton signed Executive Order 12898, which directed federal agencies to identify and address disproportionately high and adverse health and environmental effects on minority and low-income populations. The EJScreen tool was developed to give the nation a better and more consistent understanding of different communities and demographics throughout the united states and to be able to be used by EPA, government officials, and the general public. It was created because the EPA needed a consistent, data-driven way to screen for potential environmental justice concerns across the United States. The tool helped fill the gap in the previously lacked standardized tool that could visualize environmental and demographic risks together, prioritize areas for further investigation and action, and support policy, funding, and community decisions.

== Environmental and Demographic Indicators ==
The EJScreen tool takes environmental burden and justice indicators into account when accessing its data. These environmental indicators including air pollutants such as PM2.5, ozone, and nitrogen dioxide, toxic releases to air, diesel particulate matter, proximity to hazardous facilities, traffic proximity, lead paint, superfund proximity, underground storage tanks, wastewater discharge, and drinking water non-compliance. This tool also looks at demographic and socioeconomic indicators such as the demographic index, the supplemental demographic index, people of color, low income, unemployment rate, limited english speaking, less than high school education, under age 65, and over age 64. It also goes through indicators of climate change such as areas with flood risk, wildfire risk, 100 year floodplain, sea level rise, and extreme heat. The tool helps provides data on areas with people with health disparities such as low life expectancy, heart disease, asthma, cancer, and disabilities. Lastly, it displays data on the critical service gaps win communities such as broadband gaps, lack of health insurance, housing burden, transportation access burden, and food deserts. These different indicators and indexes help access environment health and change with communtial health and disparities, so the public can see a single score to help identify overburdened communities.

== Accessibility ==
As of February 5, 2025, the EJScreen has been removed from public access on the United States Environmental Protection Agency website due to the 2025 Trump administration rollbacks on environmental initiatives. Since its removal from the EPA website, it has been made publicly available after being remade. This mapping tool is now available on the Data Screening Tools website, which also provides other additional tools that have been discontinued, such as the Climate and Economic Justice Screening Tool, the Local Investment Map for Demonstration and Deployment Projects, the Environmental Justice Analysis Multisite (EJAM) tool, and the FEMA’s Future Risk Index. Aside from the EJScreen tool being removed, data from EJScreen could also no longer be downloaded by users. The removal of this tool from the EPA website also has a relationship with EPA removing sites regarding diversity, equity, and inclusion (DEI) as well. Something that makes the EJScreen tool so accessible, is that it is available publicly and not just for politicians and government authorities.

== Contributions ==
Environmentalists and environmental justice activists have used EJScreen to help identify areas with higher environmental and economic risks and burdens. These assessments have been used to help shape environmental justice projects and policies to help those communities in need. Tools such as the EJScreen tool, make information on water quality, air quality, and certain environmental hazards in certain demographics accessible to the public. Common uses of this tool include community advocacy and grassroots activism, policy planning and environmental justice assessments, public health research, and supporting application for federal funding and grants. There is an initiative called the Justice 40 initiative that helps determine which communities and demographics require investments where environmental issues are taking place.

== Case Studies ==
=== 1. Bladensburg, Maryland ===
EJScreen Application: In Bladensburg, Maryland, in a predominately African American and Latino community in Prince George's County, the Maryland Environmental Justice Screening Tool was employed to assess environmental risks. The analysis revealed that Bladensburg, Maryland had an environmental justice index score higher than 99% of the county's census tracts, which indicate significant environmental burdens. The residents faced elevated risks of cancer due to air pollution from nearby traffic and a nearby concrete plants. This data empowered local advocacy groups to push for targeted interventions to mitigate these risks.

=== 2. Greenway Planning ===
Environmental Protection Agency Case Study: A local non-governmental organization (NGO) utilized EJScreen alongside EnviroAtlas to inform the planning of a greenway project. By overlaying environmental and demographic data, the NGO identified areas with high pollution burdens and vulnerable populations. This approach ensured that the greenway would serve communities that needed the most help, which promoted equitable access to green spaces and environmental benefits.

=== 3. Houston, Texas ===
Education Application: In Houston, Texas, educators incorporated EJScreen into a curriculum to teach students about environmental justice. The students used the tool to create side-by-side maps that highlighted the disparities in pollution exposure across different neighborhoods and communities. This hands-on approach in an educational standpoint fostered a deeper understanding of the socio -economic and -environmental systems and empowered students to engage with community and societal issues.
