= Peter Dodge =

American meteorologist

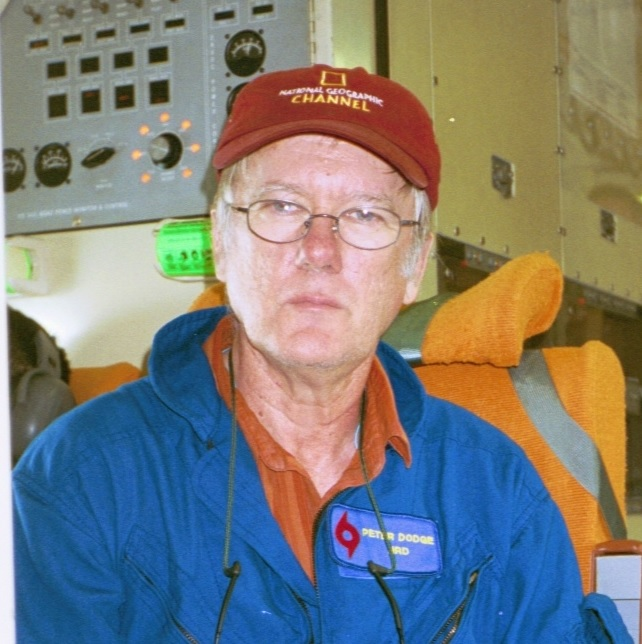
- Photo inside a Hurricane Hunter in 2005.
- Born: July 21, 1950
- Died: March 3, 2023 (aged 72)
- Resting place: Gulf of Mexico
- Education: master's degree
- Alma mater: University of Washington
- Occupation: Meteorologist
- Employer: Atlantic Oceanographic and Meteorological Laboratory; Federal Government of the United States; Peace Corps
- Awards: Department of Commerce Bronze Medal; NOAA Administrator's Award; NOAA Administrator's Award; Department of the Army Civilian Awards

Peter Dodge (July 21, 1950 – March 3, 2023) was an American meteorologist and noted expert on radar technology. The Florida resident participated in hundreds of hurricane hunting missions to improve understanding of hurricane formation.

== Early life and education ==
Dodge graduated from Michigan State University in 1972 with a B.S. in Mathematics. He volunteered with the Peace Corps, teaching math and science at a rural high school in Nepal. He worked in a National Oceanic and Atmospheric Administration (NOAA) cooperative program at the Prototype Regional Observing and Forecasting System in Boulder, Colorado, before receiving a master's degree from the University of Washington in Seattle.

== Career ==
As a researcher with the NOAA's Atlantic Oceanographic and Meteorological Laboratory, Dodge served as onboard radar scientist on 386 NOAA Hurricane Hunters missions aboard "Miss Piggy", a Lockheed P-3 Orion. In addition, he developed flight modules and conducted research on the evolution of hurricanes' structures.

He focused on the behavior of rain cells during a hurricane. He had the scare of his life during the 1989 Hurricane Hunters NOAA 42 incident during a study flight of hurricane Hugo. Toward the end of his career, he lost his sight but continued to contribute to missions with the aid of a Braille keyboard.

== Recognition ==
During his 44-year career in the United States federal government, he was awarded the Department of Commerce Bronze Medal, two NOAA Administrator's Awards, and the Army Corps of Engineers Patriotic Civilian Service Award. As part of the Hurricane Research Division, he received a Department of Commerce Gold Medal and a Public Service Award at the Interdepartmental Hurricane Conference for service during the 1998 hurricane season.

== Death and legacy ==
Dodge died in 2023 after suffering a stroke. The following year, a Hurricane Hunters mission buried him at sea about 300 miles (480 km) southwest of Florida. After reading "Peace, my heart" by Rabindranath Tagore, the crew released a dropsonde containing his cremated remains into the eye of Hurricane Milton, then a Category 5 hurricane. The flight's vortex data message marks the moment as the end of his "387th" mission.

== Works ==
- Powell, Mark D.; Murillo, Shirley; Dodge, Peter; Uhlhorn, Eric; Gamache, John; Cardone, Vince; Cox, Andrew; Otero, Sonia; Carrasco, Nick; Annane, Bachir; St. Fleur, Russell (January 2010). "Reconstruction of Hurricane Katrina's wind fields for storm surge and wave hindcasting". Ocean Engineering. 37 (1): 26–36. doi:10.1016/J.OCEANENG.2009.08.014.
