= Aircraft Operations Center =

Coordinates: 27°58′52″N 82°00′57″W

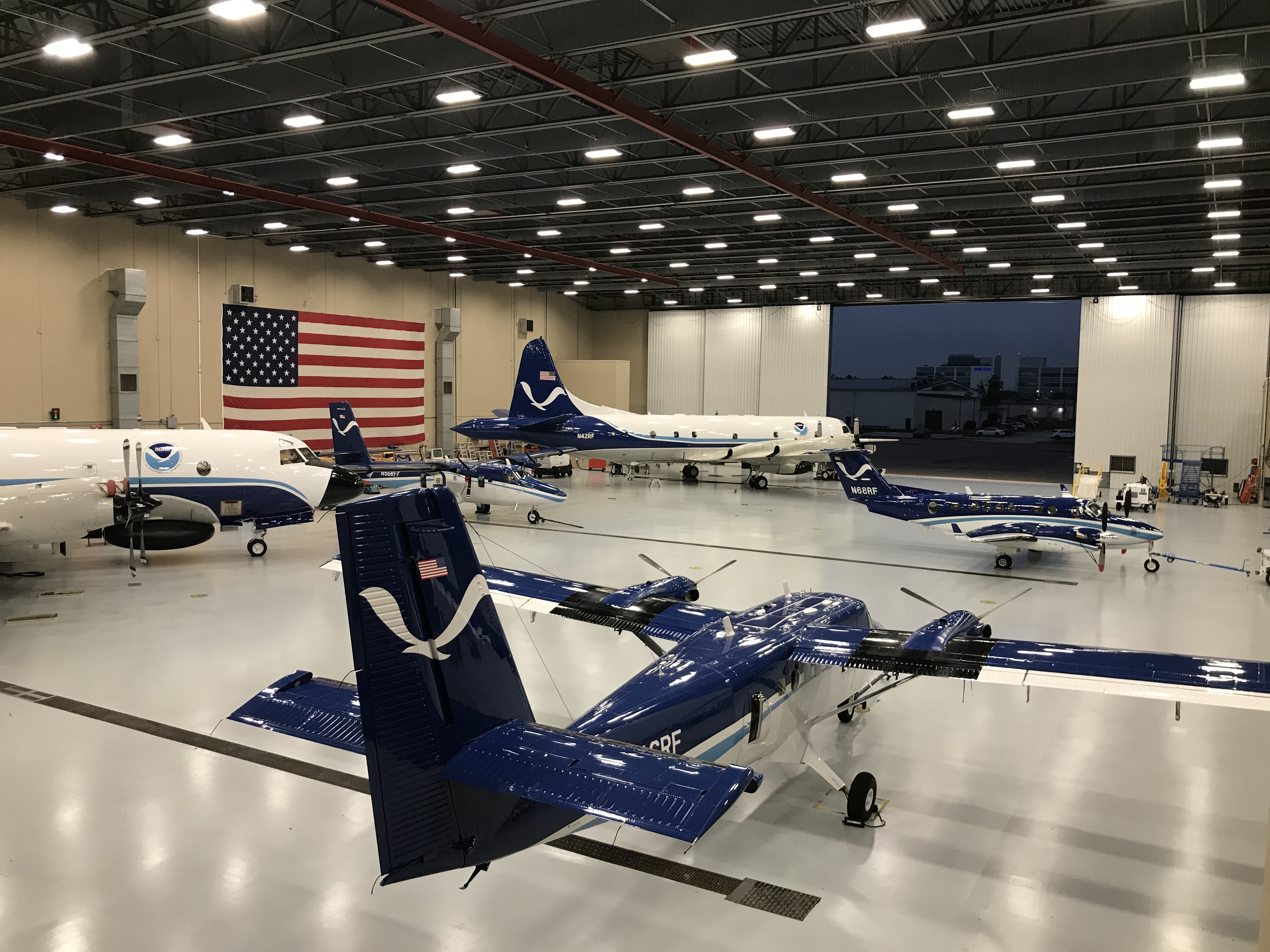
NOAA's two Lockheed WP-3D Orion aircraft along with a De Havilland Canada DHC-6 Twin Otter (foreground) and a Beechcraft King Air inside the NOAA Aircraft Operations Center hangar in Lakeland, Florida.

The Aircraft Operations Center (AOC) is the main aircraft base for the National Oceanic and Atmospheric Administration (NOAA) of the United States government, under the operation of the NOAA Commissioned Officer Corps. AOC houses 10 NOAA aircraft, including the Hurricane Hunters.

It is the home of the NOAA Aircraft Operations Center, which houses multiple light aircraft, and three Hurricane Hunters aircraft. This base plays a large role every hurricane season, supporting NOAA flights in and around tropical cyclones for research and forecasting.

The AOC has been located at Lakeland Linder International Airport in Lakeland, Florida, since June 2017 and is under the NOAA Office of Marine and Aviation Operations. The AOC resided at MacDill Air Force Base in Tampa, Florida, from January 1993 to June 2017.

== Aircraft ==
NOAA operates a fleet of ten crewed aircraft:

- Two Lockheed WP-3D Orion – heavily instrumented turboprops used for hurricane hunting nicknamed "Kermit" (N42RF) and "Miss Piggy" (N43RF)
- One Gulfstream IV-SP (G-IV) – twin turbofan jet aircraft for high-altitude hurricane research and atmospheric river research nicknamed "Gonzo" (N49RF)
- Four De Havilland Canada DHC-6 Twin Otter – twin turboprop for marine mammal, hydrological, remote sensing, air chemistry and emergency response programs
- Three Beechcraft King Air 350CER – twin turboprop aircraft for coastal mapping, snow and soil moisture surveys, emergency response, and GRAV-D

== See also ==
- NOAA ships and aircraft
