= Flight 42 =

Flight 42 may refer to:

- NOAA Flight 42, engine failure caused by electrical failure due to moisture from the heavy rain while flying through Hurricane Hugo
- Siberian Light Aviation Flight 42, crash landed after suffering from engine failure due to icing on 16 July 2021
- Trans World Airlines Flight 42, involved in a mid-air collision on 4 December 1965
