= Lockheed WP-3D Orion =

NOAA hurricane hunter aircraft

WP-3D Orion
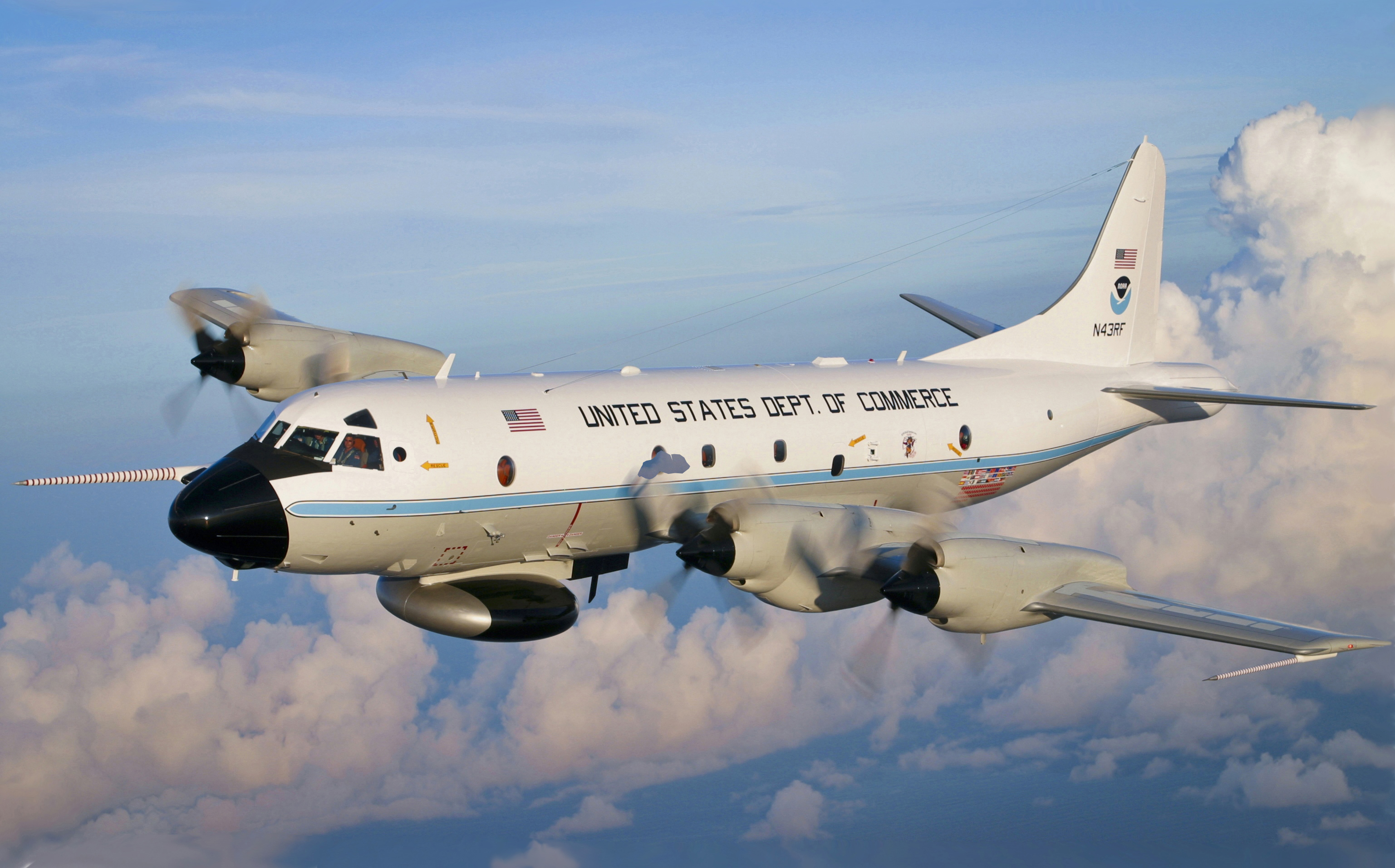
- NOAA Lockheed WP-3D Orion Hurricane Hunter

General information
- Type: Weather reconnaissance
- National origin: United States
- Manufacturer: Lockheed
- Status: Active
- Primary user: National Oceanic and Atmospheric Administration
- Number built: 2

History
- Introduction date: August 1976
- First flight: 1975
- Developed from: Lockheed P-3 Orion

The Lockheed WP-3D Orion is a highly modified P-3 Orion used by the Aircraft Operations Center division of the National Oceanic and Atmospheric Administration (NOAA). The aircraft are operated by aviation officers of the NOAA Commissioned Officer Corps. Only two of these aircraft exist, each incorporating numerous features for the role of collecting weather information. During the Atlantic hurricane season, the WP-3Ds are deployed for duty as hurricane hunters. The aircraft also supports research on other topics, such as Arctic ice coverage, air chemistry studies, and ocean water temperature and current analysis.

== Design ==
The WP-3Ds are equipped with three weather radars, C band radar in the nose and on the lower fuselage, and an X-band radar in the aircraft's tail. They are also equipped with the ability to deploy dropsondes into storm systems, and have onboard temperature sensors, and other meteorological equipment. While these aircraft are not specially strengthened for flying into hurricanes, their decks were reinforced to withstand the additional equipment load.

It has a barber's pole sampler (named for its red and white stripes) that protrude from the aircraft's front, a tail Doppler weather radar, and other instruments hanging from the wing.

== Operational history ==
NOAA currently operates two WP-3Ds nicknamed Miss Piggy and Kermit, and their logos feature the characters created by Jim Henson Productions. NOAA's other hurricane hunting aircraft, the Gulfstream IV-SP, is named Gonzo; they complement the fleet of WC-130 aircraft operated by the United States Air Force 53rd Weather Reconnaissance Squadron. As of 2014, the two Orions had each flown more than 10,000 hours and flown into more than 80 hurricanes. In 2024, NOAA announced plans to replace these two aircraft with modified C-130Js, and they are scheduled to be retired by 2030.

Between 2015 and 2017, the aircraft received major overhauls, costing a total of $35 million. This work was performed by the United States Navy's Fleet Readiness Center Southeast in Jacksonville Florida. The work included new wings and engines and upgraded radars and avionics. NOAA anticipates that these changes will allow the aircraft to fly until between 2032 and 2037.

== Specifications (WP-3D Orion) ==
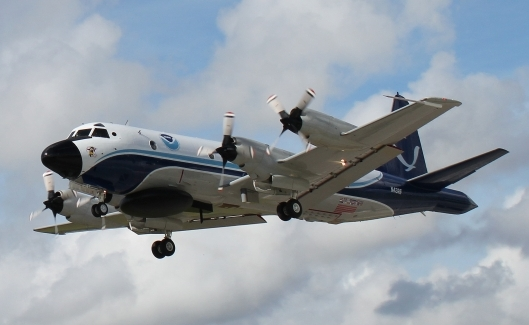
Lockheed WP-3D Orion in flight with NOAA's newer paint scheme

Data from Riders of the storms

General characteristics

- Crew: Up to 22 (3 pilots, 2 flight engineers, navigator, flight director, 2–3 engineering/electronics specialists, radio/avionics specialist and up to 12 scientists)
- Length: 116 ft 10 in (35.61 m)
- Wingspan: 99 ft 8 in (30.38 m)
- Height: 34 ft 3 in (10.44 m)
- Wing area: 1,300.0 sq ft (120.77 m^{2})
- Aspect ratio: 7.5:1
- Empty weight: 73,000 lb (33,112 kg)
- Max takeoff weight: 135,000 lb (61,235 kg)
- Powerplant: 4 × Allison T56-14 turboprops, 4,500 shp (3,400 kW) each

Performance

- Cruise speed: 250 kn (290 mph, 460 km/h)
- Range: 3,800 nmi (4,400 mi, 7,000 km) at high altitude; 2,500 nmi (2,900 mi; 4,600 km) at low altitude
- Endurance: 11.5 hours at high altitude; 9.5 hours at low altitude
- Service ceiling: 27,000 ft (8,200 m)
- Rate of climb: 3,000 ft/min (15 m/s)

== Accidents and incidents ==
On September 15 1989, NOAA 42, a Hurricane Hunter aircraft, experienced an engine fire due to a sensor failure while flying through Hurricane Hugo. The crew managed to extinguish the fire and land safely back at Grantley Adams International Airport in Barbados.

== See also ==
- Hurricane Hunters

Related development

- Lockheed P-3 Orion

Aircraft of comparable role, configuration, and era

- Lockheed WC-130
- Convair 580 – National Research Council (Canada) converted to perform atmospheric testing

Related lists

- List of aircraft of the AOC

== Notes ==
- Broadbent, Mark (January 2019). "Riders of the storms". Air International. Vol. 96, no. 1. p. 93. ISSN 0306-5634.
- Michell, Simon, ed. (1994). Jane's Civil and Military Aircraft Upgrades 1994–95. Coulsdon, UK: Jane's Information Group. ISBN 0-7106-1208-7.
