= 1989 Hurricane Hunters NOAA 42 incident =

1989 aviation incident over the Atlantic Ocean

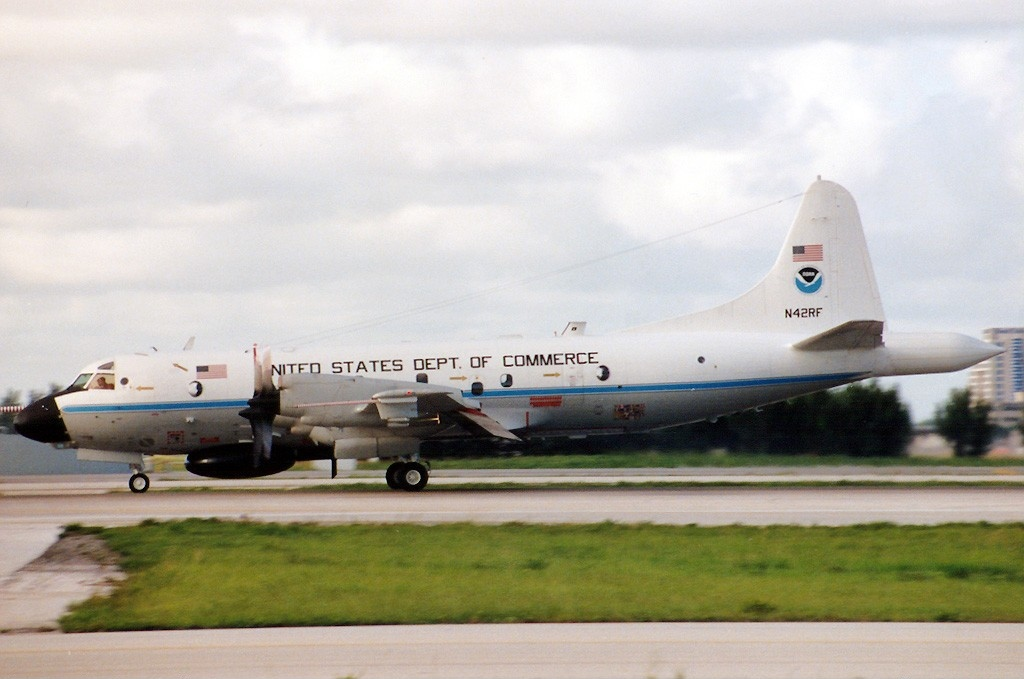
- N42RF, the aircraft involved in the incident, seen in July 1989

Incident
- Date: September 15, 1989
- Summary: Engine fire due to sensor failure
- Site: Near Barbados, Atlantic Ocean

Aircraft
- Aircraft type: Lockheed WP-3D Orion
- Aircraft name: Kermit
- Operator: National Oceanic and Atmospheric Administration
- Registration: N42RF
- Flight origin: Grantley Adams International Airport, Barbados
- Destination: Grantley Adams International Airport, Barbados
- Occupants: 16
- Crew: 16
- Fatalities: 0
- Survivors: 16

On September 15, 1989, a Lockheed WP-3D Orion operated by the National Oceanic and Atmospheric Administration (NOAA) experienced an engine fire and nearly crashed while flying through the eyewall of Hurricane Hugo. The crew managed to extinguish the fire and safely return to Barbados.

== Background ==
Following the 1943 Surprise Hurricane, the National Hurricane Center began doing routine reconnaissance missions into hurricanes, known as "Hurricane Hunter" missions. Among the planes used was a WP-3D Orion serviced by the NOAA and nicknamed Kermit (callsign N42RF). In 1989, this plane had been deployed to Barbados alongside another WP-3D Orion as part of a research experiment coordinated by the Hurricane Research Division. The goal of the mission (termed the Hurricane Energetics experiment) was to gather data related to the hurricane (such as wind speeds and the location of the hurricane) which would help predict future hurricanes before they occur and thus save lives. Leading up to 1989, only one plane had crashed in the Atlantic during a reconnaissance flight: Snowcloud Five in 1955, which flew into Hurricane Janet at 700 feet (210 m) and crashed in the eyewall with a loss of all 11 passengers (though there had been several other crashes in the Western Pacific).

=== Crew ===
The crew consisted of:

- Aircraft Commander Lowell Genzlinger
- Pilot Gerry Mckim
- Flight Director Jeff Masters
- Flight Engineer Steve Wade
- Navigator Sean White
- Radio Operator Tom Nunn
- Systems Engineers Al Goldstein and Terry Schricker
- Radar Technician Neil Rain
- Lead Scientist Frank Marks
- Radar Scientist Peter Dodge
- Doppler Radar Scientist Bob Burpee
- Air-Sea Scientist Pete Black
- Dropsonde Scientist Hugh Willoughby
- Observer Jim McFadden
- Reporter Janice Griffith of the Barbados Sun

== Incident ==
According to the latest satellite estimates at the time of the flight, Hurricane Hugo was believed to be at Category 3 strength. Thus it was decided that the first reconnaissance mission into the storm would fly in at 1,500 feet (460 m) to study the low-level environment (such a move had been done earlier in the year with Hurricane Gabrielle) while another mission would fly at 20,000 feet (6,100 m) to study the large-scale environment. Takeoff went without any issues and the plane easily climbed to 10,000 feet (3,048 m).

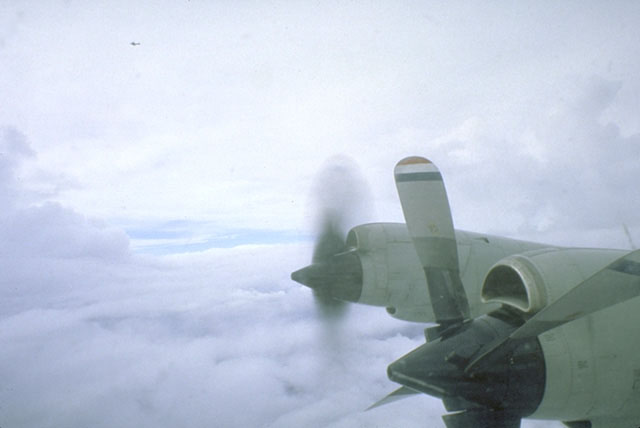
The WP-3 Orion after its inner-most right-wing engine failed

After takeoff, the plane's belly radar failed, depriving the crew of valuable data on the strength of the storm, but it was fixed after 20 minutes. This problem, however, left only 5 minutes to examine the radar before they had to begin the descent. Flight director Jeff Masters briefly examined the radar and determined that the storm was still likely Category 3 strength and went through with the descent. As they began to fly through the rainbands, the turbulence in the storm was not unusual and as they approached the eyewall the winds fell to unusually low values making the crew believe the storm was actually weaker than a Category 3, so they decided go ahead and fly in at 1,500 feet (460 m), but plan on ascending to 5,000 feet (1,500 m) if it got too rough. In reality, they had failed to notice that the eyewall was maxing out the radar scale they were using at multiple points, a sign of a much stronger storm.

Upon entering the eyewall, the pressure began to fall rapidly as the winds began rising much faster than expected, eventually increasing to Category 5 intensity with winds near 200 miles per hour (322 km/h). At first the turbulence wasn't terrible, but it took both pilots to control the plane. After one minute, the plane then began to experience severe updrafts and downdrafts, with the crew going through periods of being slammed into their seats at multiple gs of force to feeling weightless. An updraft of 20 miles per hour (32 km/h) was then followed by a downdraft of 22 miles per hour (35 km/h) causing unsecured objects to fly around in the cabin. Shortly after, the plane was hit by a 45 miles per hour (72 km/h) updraft, but at this point it began to brighten up outside signaling the eye was close. But right before they entered the eye, dark clouds reconsumed the plane and 3 consecutive intense drafts of wind hit the plane causing it to begin a dive toward the ocean and the 200 pounds (91 kg) life rafts to break loose, hitting the ceiling of the plane and permanently denting it while other equipment drawer locks failed causing everything from soda cans to tapes to hit the ceiling and rain down on the crew. The violent winds created in the eyewall put enormous g-forces on the plane, reaching +5.8 g's and -3.7 g's, far greater than it was built to withstand. The crew noticed that the number 3 engine had been overheating, and it now caught fire. Finally the crew made it to the eye.

Once in the eye, the dive was stabilized just 880 feet (270 m) above the water at 17:28 UTC. However, complicated by the attention needed to shut down the flaming number 3 engine, and requiring tight turns to stay circling within the eye, they chose the wrong direction initially and nearly reentered the eyewall a second time. Finally with a precariously steep turn the pilots were able to establish a course consistently within the eye. A damage inspection showed that not only was the number 3 engine out of commission, but the deicing boot on the number 4 engine had started to detach. If the boot broke free and damaged that engine, they could lose all power from that side of the aircraft. To avoid overworking the three remaining engines, the pilots continued to orbit the 9-mile-wide (14-kilometer) wide eye of Hugo for an hour and slowly ascending. To lighten the load and gain more height, fuel was ejected from Kermit's lower fuselage and a suite of now-superfluous ocean sensing instruments were fired off. After finishing the dumps, Teal 57, an Air Force C-130 reconnaissance plane, arrived in the storm flying at 10,000 feet (3,000 m). The crew of this flight did multiple passes around NOAA 42 to look for any other outside damage, finding none. Teal 57 then started eyewall penetrations to seek a safe passage for NOAA 42 to fly out of. NOAA 43 also arrived at 15,000 feet (4,600 m), but NOAA 42 was unable to climb that high due to their damaged engine. The eastern and southern parts of the eyewall were found to not be safe, but on the third pass made by Teal 57 they found a better option in the northeast side. NOAA 42 was able to climb to an altitude of 7,000 feet (2,134 m) before departing the eye via that northeast course safely (losing the deicing boot in the process). NOAA 43 followed NOAA 42 out, while Teal 57 remained in the eye to continue their mission. The two planes finally landed safely at Grantley Adams International Airport in Barbados with no further incidents. Miraculously, there were no injuries on the flight.

== Investigation ==
The investigation conducted by the NOAA found that the sensor on the fuel control unit of the number 3 engine could not regulate the amount of fuel flowing to the engine, resulting in too much fuel flowing to the engine and causing it to catch fire. The turbulence encountered by NOAA 42 was not a factor in the engine fire. The investigation also found that the eyewall of Hurricane Hugo contained mesovortices (small tornado-like areas with extremely strong winds) which was a weather phenomenon never before seen in hurricanes. The researchers were unaware of the mesovortices present due to the belly radar failing before entering the eyewall (they could not check the updated weather conditions which were changing rapidly) and as a result NOAA 42 flew straight into one. The investigation also found that NOAA 42 entered the eyewall at just 1,500 feet (457 m), 3,500 feet (1,067 m) lower than recommended for a hurricane of Hugo's size and intensity.

== Aftermath ==
Following this mission, aircraft from the U.S. Air Force (USAF) and National Oceanic and Atmospheric Administration (NOAA) would continue to penetrate the eye of Hurricane Hugo, doing so 76 times between September 15 and September 22, documenting the location of the storm's center roughly once every two hours. The data collected by NOAA 42 on Hurricane Hugo led to improvements in reporting of weather forecasts and predicting a hurricane's path and intensity. NOAA 42 went on to document more than 30 hurricanes, but none during the rest of the 1989 season. Several changes were put in place regarding hurricane reconnaissance flights requiring all aircraft to fly into the eyewall of a hurricane at an altitude no lower than 5,000 feet (1,500 m) and that crews should review the mission at hand before flying into a hurricane. Team members Terry Schricker and Jeff Masters would never do another hurricane hunter mission following this event.

== In popular culture ==
The incident was featured in season 13, episode 6 of the Canadian television series Mayday titled "Into the Eye of the Storm". Shelly Price and Stephanie Hubka from the podcast series Take to the Sky: The Air Disaster Podcast talk about the NOAA 42 incident.
