= NOAA Hurricane Hunters =

Group of aircraft maintained by the NOAA

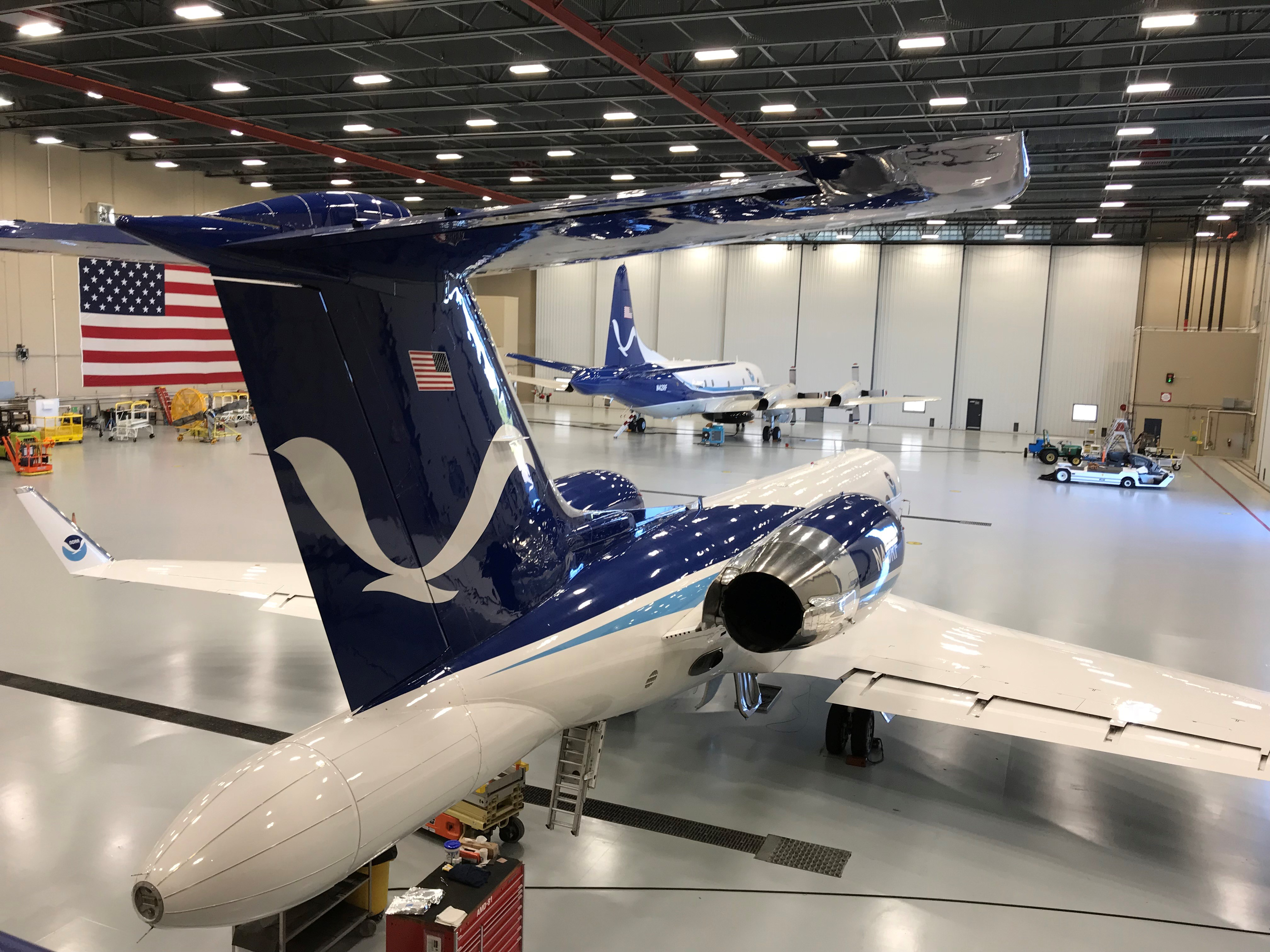
- Location: Lakeland Linder International Airport

The NOAA Hurricane Hunters are a group of aircraft used for hurricane reconnaissance by the United States National Oceanic and Atmospheric Administration (NOAA). They fly through hurricanes to help forecasters and scientists gather operational and research data. The crews also conduct other research projects including ocean wind studies, winter storm research, thunderstorm research, coastal erosion, and air chemistry flights.

== Organization ==
The Hurricane Hunters belong to the Aircraft Operations Center (AOC), located at Lakeland Linder International Airport in Lakeland, Florida, United States. The Aircraft Operations Center is a complement of commissioned personnel from the NOAA Commissioned Corps, federal employees and contractors under the Office of Marine and Aviation Operations (OMAO), which is a line office of the NOAA, which is in turn an agency of the Department of Commerce. The AOC resided at Hangar 5 of MacDill AFB from January 1993 to June 2017.

== Aircraft ==
NOAA uses two Lockheed WP-3D Orion turboprops to fly through hurricanes and a Gulfstream IV-SP which flies around the upper fringes of storms to get a read on steering currents. The NOAA also uses light aircraft for some of its research. With permission from Jim Henson Productions, NOAA's P-3s are nicknamed Kermit the Frog (N42RF) and Miss Piggy (N43RF). The G-IV (N49RF) is nicknamed Gonzo. In September 2024, NOAA awarded a contract to Lockheed Martin to produce two modern modified C-130J Hercules aircraft to replace the aged WP-3D Orion, with them expected to enter service by 2030.

=== Lockheed WP-3D Orion ===
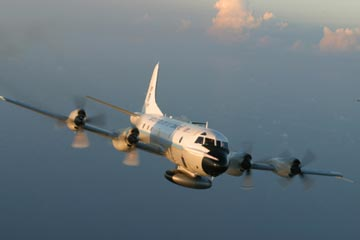
One of the pair of NOAA's Lockheed WP-3D Orions

The Lockheed WP-3D Orion was designed to tolerate large amounts of turbulence since it flies through the eyes of hurricanes. The WP-3 can be thought of as a flying research lab as it is equipped to take atmospheric measurements. One of the most distinctive parts of the WP-3 is the prominent black, circular belly radome.

Staffed with up to 20 crew members, including pilots and scientists, a normal hurricane reconnaissance or research mission can last from 9–10 hours, while a surveillance ("fix" mission) mission will typically last 8 hours, often in rotation with WC-130 flights from the Air Force Reserve Command's 53rd Weather Reconnaissance Squadron (53 WRS) at six-hour intervals. Most often, the scientists and crew aboard the aircraft deploy dropsondes with GPS which collect and transmit data as they descend toward the ocean. Once this data is received and checked by the crew, it is sent to the NOAA National Hurricane Center for analysis. Other data is collected and transmitted by request. Personnel on board include pilots, navigators, engineers, technicians, and flight meteorologists (Flight Directors).

Past projects use the WP-3 have included low level jet observation over South America, a bow echo and mesoscale convective study in the Midwest, and ocean wind satellite verification missions over the Northern Atlantic and Pacific.

=== Lockheed C-130J Hercules ===
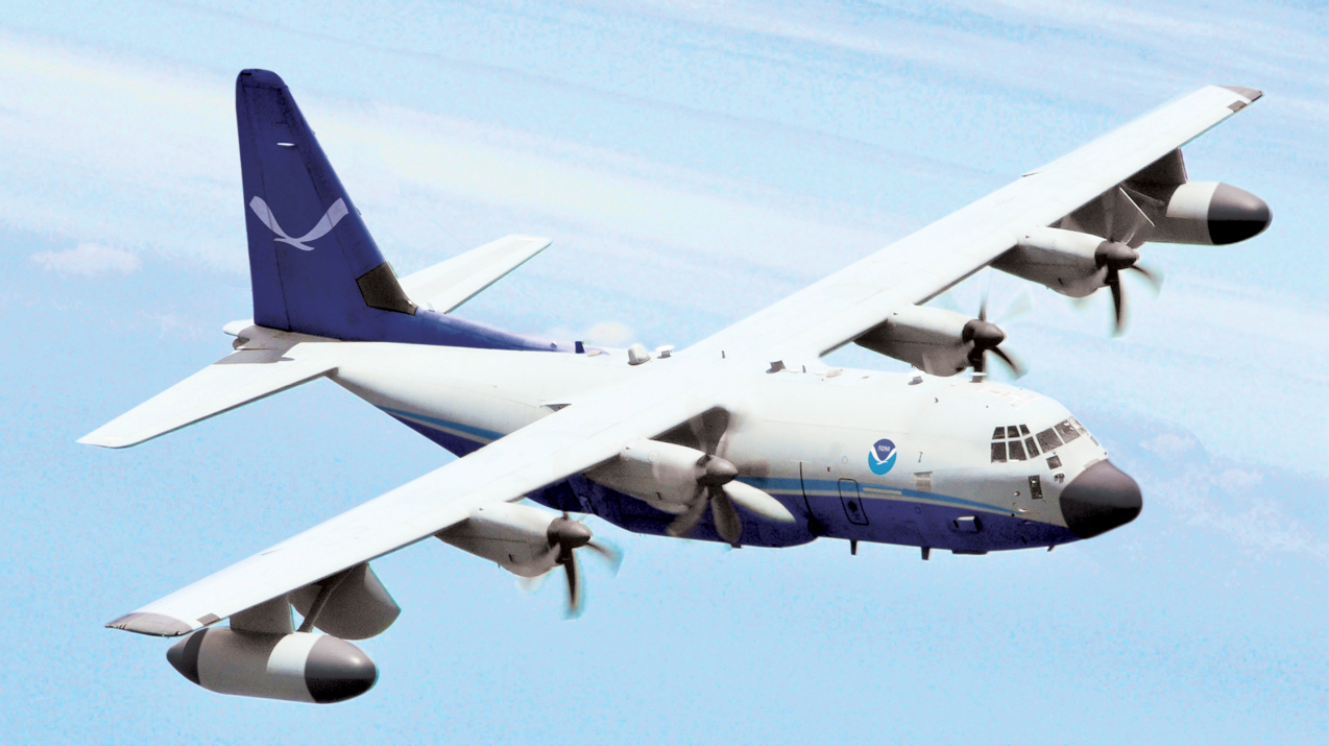
Artist's rendition of the C-130J hurricane hunter variant to be delivered to NOAA in 2030.

The C-130J Hercules, the future replacement for the WP-3D Orion, will be able to tolerate large amounts of turbulence flying through the hurricanes. The new aircraft will "accommodate larger science payloads [and] will be equipped with a variety of updated instrumentation developed from experience with NOAA's current WP-3D Orion aircraft and from across the U.S. government." These aircraft are expected to enter service in 2030.

=== Gulfstream IV-SP ===
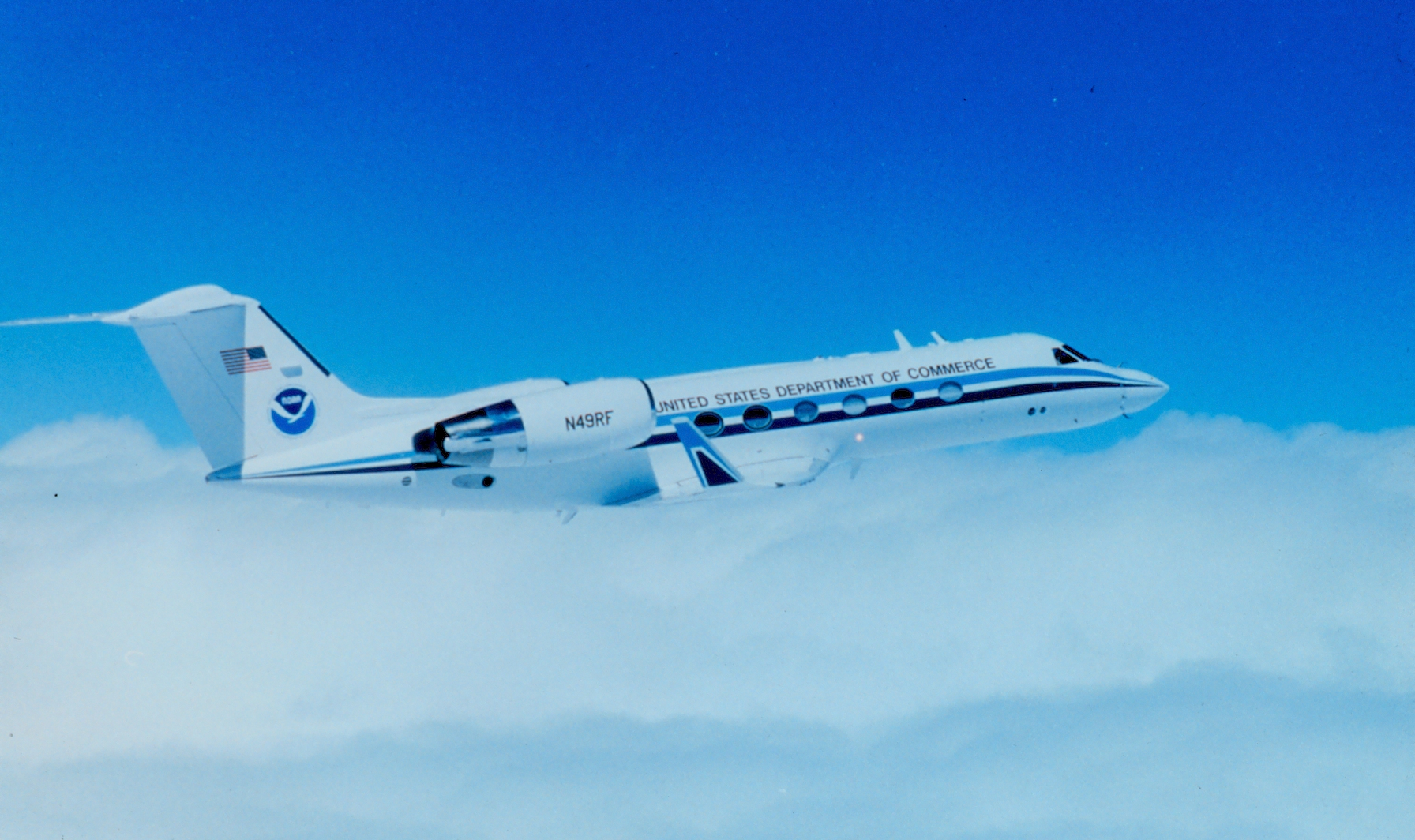
NOAA's Gulfstream IV-SP

The Gulfstream IV-SP is a high altitude jet that can fly up to 45,000 feet. The G-IV crew is similar to the WP-3 and includes NOAA Corps aviators, engineers, technicians, and a flight meteorologists (Flight Director).

The G-IV flies around the periphery of both tropical and winter storms, including hurricanes, and deploys dropsondes in order to gather data about the surrounding environment. This information is used to help predict the path of hurricanes. Dropsonde transmissions are collected and checked by an on-board Flight Director, who then transmits the data to the National Centers for Environmental Prediction (NCEP) and the National Hurricane Center (NHC) for analysis.

The G-IV serves the NCEP Winter Storm Reconnaissance program in order to better predict the location and intensity of winter storms that affect the United States. During winter storm reconnaissance, air chemistry measurements are also taken from the upper troposphere. These flights are typically flown from Honolulu, Anchorage, or Yokota AB, Japan.

== See also ==
- NOAA ships and aircraft
- Storm chasing
- 53rd Weather Reconnaissance Squadron
- Hurricane hunters (crews)
