= Gulfstream IV =

Family of private twinjet aircraft by Gulfstream Aerospace (made 1985–2018)

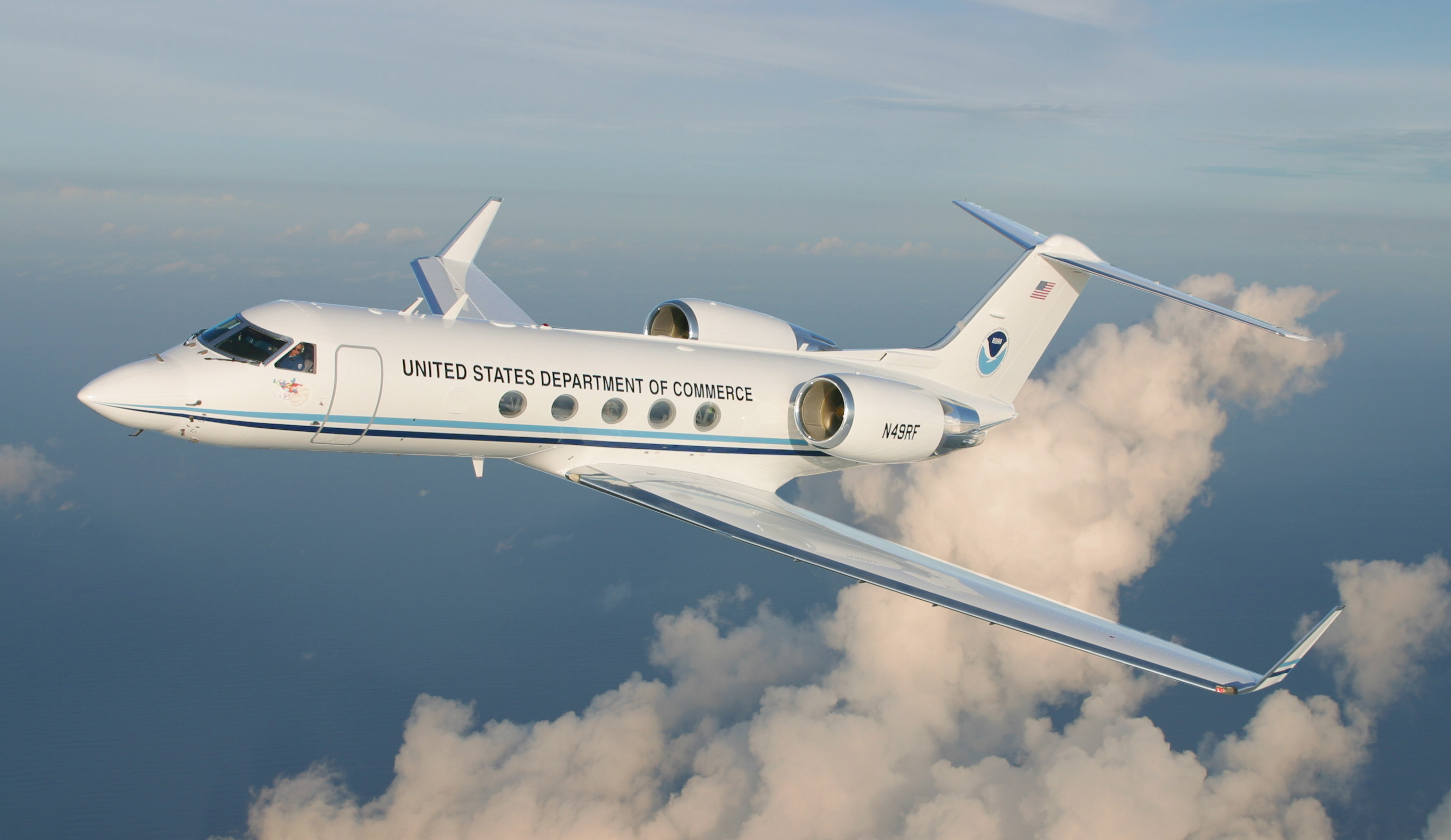
- Modified Gulfstream IV of the United States Department of Commerce; note G-IVs normally have 6 side windows

General information
- Type: Business jet
- Manufacturer: Gulfstream Aerospace
- Status: In service
- Primary users: United States Air Force United States Army; United States Navy; National Oceanic and Atmospheric Administration
- Number built: 900+

History
- Manufactured: 1985–2018
- First flight: September 19, 1985
- Developed from: Gulfstream III
- Developed into: Gulfstream V

The Gulfstream IV (or G-IV or GIV) and derivatives are a family of twinjet aircraft, mainly for private or business use. They were designed and built by Gulfstream Aerospace, a General Dynamics company based in Savannah, Georgia, United States, from 1985 until 2018. Aircraft power is provided by two Rolls-Royce RB.183 Tay turbofans.

Upon delivery of the last G450, over 900 GIV/GIV-SP/G450 units had been produced. The last of the G450s was delivered on 19 January 2018 after 365 deliveries over 12 years, ending a 30-year production run, to be replaced by the G500.

== Development ==
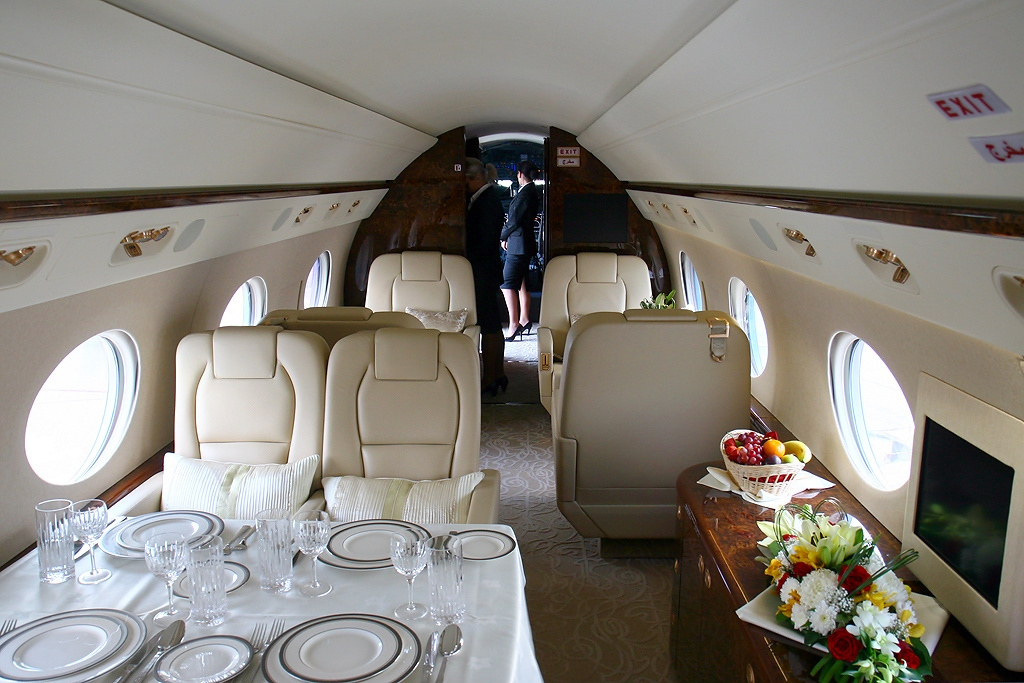
Executive cabin

Gulfstream, in collaboration with Grumman, began work on the Gulfstream IV in March 1983 as a re-engined, stretched fuselage derivative of the Gulfstream III. The first GIV made its maiden flight on September 19, 1985. The model received type certification from the FAA on April 22, 1987. The G-IV entered into service with serial number 1000 in 1987 and was upgraded to the special purpose GIV-SP version at serial number 1214 in 1993. It was later redesignated G400 at serial number 1500. A shorter range variant was created based on the GIV and given the G300 designation in 2002.

In 2001, Gulfstream began work on an improved version of the GIV-SP, originally designated GIV-X. It was later renamed G450. The G450 is lengthened 1 ft (30 cm) over the G400 and shares the forward fuselage and larger cockpit of the G550. Following its first flight on 30 April 2003, production of the G450 began in October 2004, replacing the G400. The G450 has better performance and comes with the PlaneView cockpit with four 14-inch (360 mm) liquid crystal displays and a Head up display (HUD). The shorter range G350 version of the G450 received certification in 2004.

By 2018, year 1990 to 1992 GIVs were for sale at $1.6-4.4 million, 1992 to 1999 GIVSPs were listed for $1.25-5.2 million, 15-year-old G300s and G400s were available for $4.5-7 million and 2006 to 2016 G450s at $9.95-23.75 million.

== Design ==
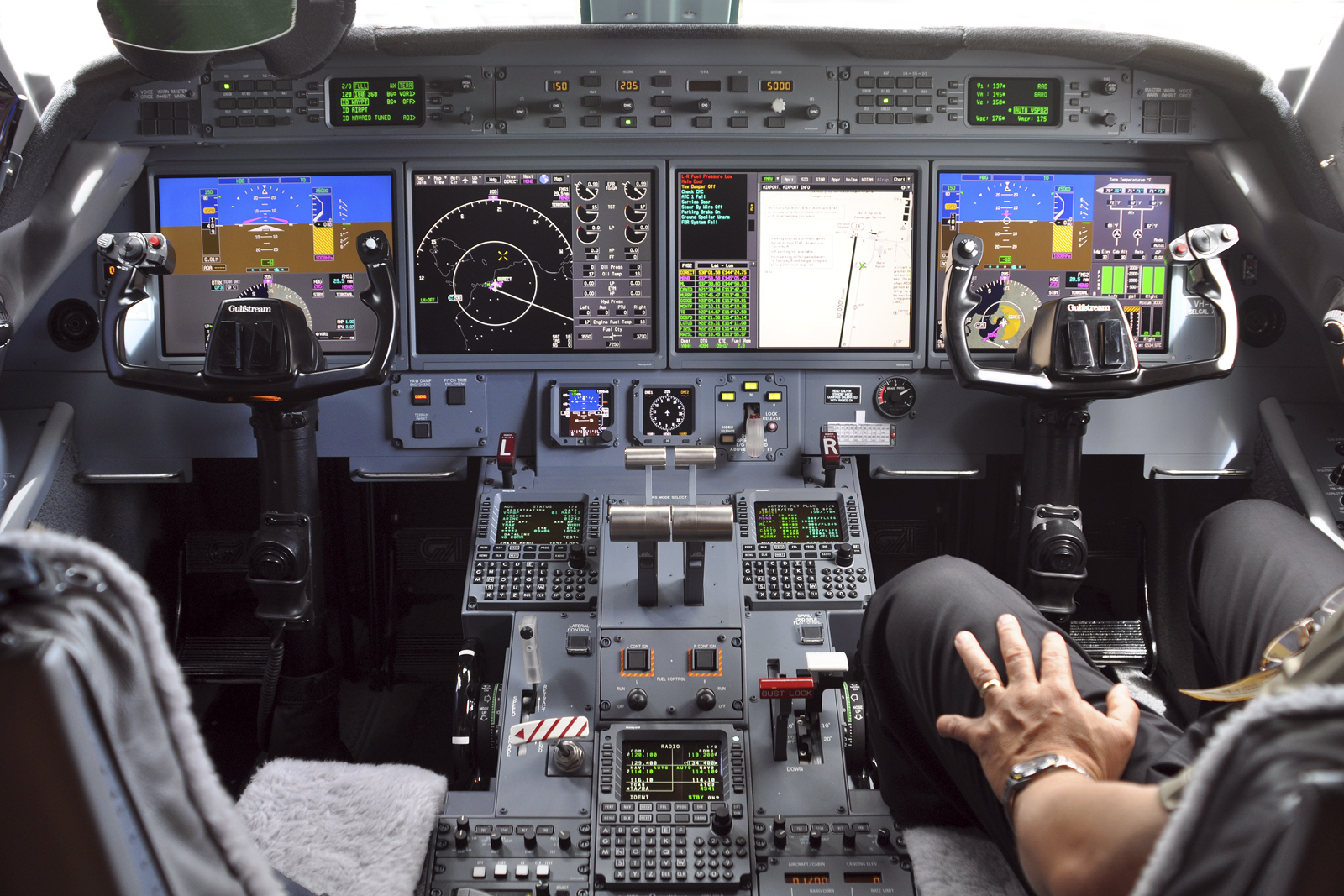
G450 updated flight deck

Compared to the Gulfstream III, a decision to redesign the wing structure for weight reduction presented an opportunity for an aerodynamic redesign of the wing to reduce cruise drag and increase range. Wing contour modifications had to be restricted to the forward 65% of wing chord so that no redesign of the control surfaces would be necessary. Modification of the inboard wing would have entailed a redesign of the fuselage floor structure, consequently this region of the wing was not modified. Outboard wing modifications were aimed at reducing the peak subcritical pressure coefficient and moving it aft in an effort to reduce shock strength and increase shock sweep.

At 12,420 lbf (55.2 kN), the Rolls-Royce Tay fanjet engines provided more thrust than the 11,400 lbf (51 kN) of the Gulfstream III. Speed, noise levels, emissions, fuel economy, range, and cargo capacity were also markedly improved over the earlier model.

The Gulfstream IV wing has a weaker more swept outboard shock, resulting in lower cruise drag. Other benefits are a lower root bending moment due to an inboard center of pressure, a lower stall speed due to washout and a larger fuel volume due to increased chord. These aerodynamic improvements result in an increase in range of over 300 nmi (560 km; 350 mi). In addition to the wing redesign, the Gulfstream IV also became the first business jet to have an entirely glass cockpit.

The G400 has a large cabin and a range of 4,350 nautical miles (8,060 km; 5,010 mi) with the same comfort and design that characterize previous Gulfstreams. Maximum cruise height and speed are 45,000 feet (14,000 m) and Mach 0.85. Earlier models were fitted with Honeywell's SPZ 8000 Avionics package. The SPZ 8400 Avionics Package was an option, becoming standard on later models. Its used price was below $15 million in 2025) in 2009 (~$21.8 million in 2025). Gulfstream had also considered making a 5.5 m (18 ft) longer, 24-27 seat model for airline use.

== Operational history ==
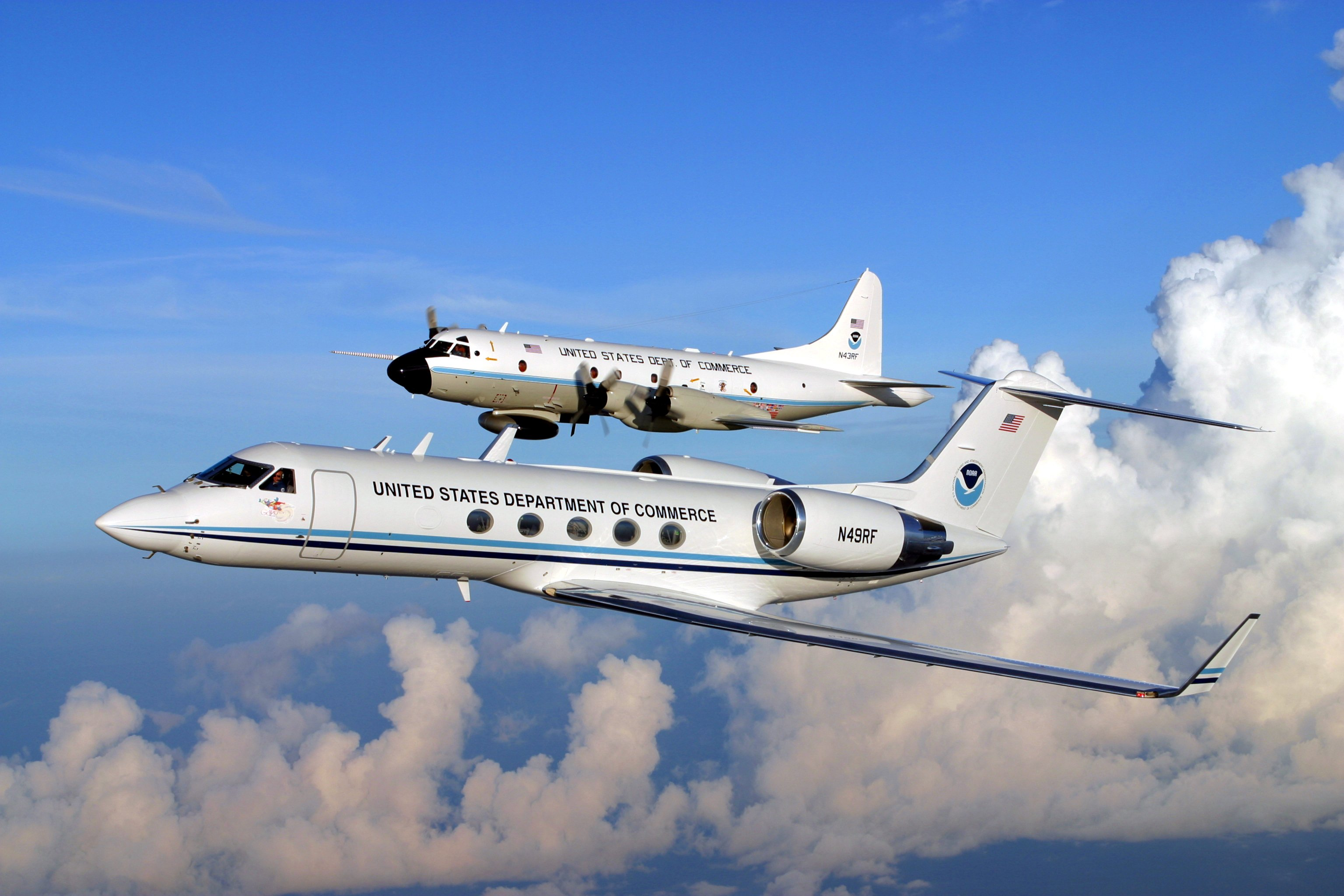
NOAA's GIV and WP-3

The National Oceanic and Atmospheric Administration (NOAA) operates a GIV-SP (N49RF) modified to fly scientists and crew members at 45,000 ft (14,000 m) around tropical cyclones. The aircraft was modified to drop instruments called "dropsondes" to measure windspeed, barometric pressure, humidity, and temperature as they fall to the surface of the ocean. By sampling the cyclone with these dropsondes over a 4,000 mi (6,400 km) track around the storm, the forecasters at NOAA's National Hurricane Center and Hurricane Research Division can better predict where the hurricane will be "steered" by the upper level winds. They also predict wind shear that will either increase or decrease a hurricane's strength. The GIV-SP is suited for this mission since it is fast, and can fly long distances with ample cabin space for the crew and instruments. In 2009, the NOAA GIV-SP was further modified by the addition of a side-scanning Doppler weather radar to the rear fuselage. This radar is used for storm cloud profiling.

In June 1987, a Gulfstream IV set 22 world records in its class flying west around the world in 45 hr 25 min. The next year another GIV set 11 world records flying east around the world. In 1990, Gulfstream CEO Allen Paulson and a Gulfstream flight crew set 35 international records for around-the-world flight in a GIV.

== Variants ==
=== C-20F/G/H/J military variants ===
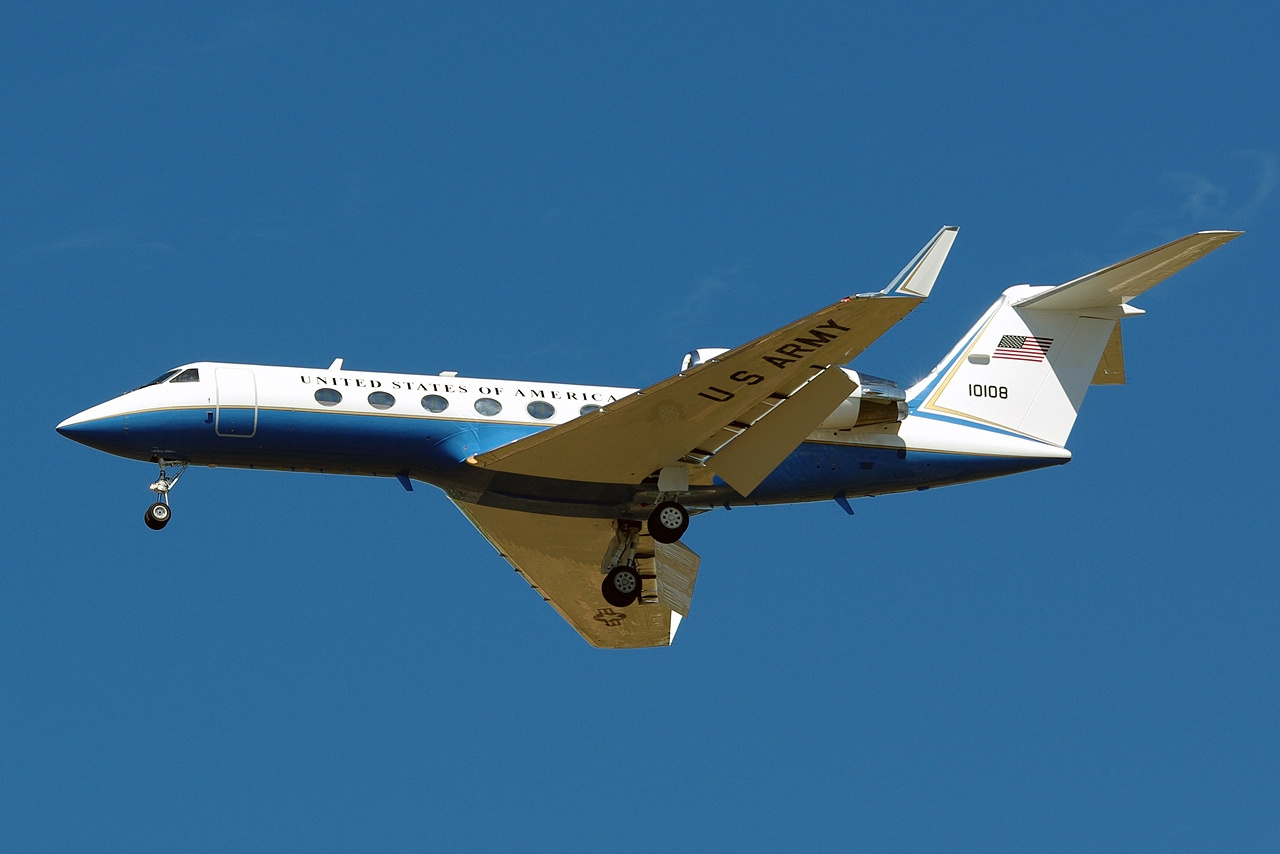
U.S. Army C-20F

The U.S. military variant of the IV, designated C-20F/G/H/J Gulfstream IV in Department of Defense service. The C-20F is a GIV model operated by the U.S. Army in a command/executive transport role.

The C-20G aircraft may be configured for cargo operations, 26 passenger operations or combinations of the two. With passengers seats removed, it may be configured as three pallets with no passengers or two pallets and eight passengers or one pallet and fourteen passengers. With full seating, the aircraft is capable of accommodating up to twenty-six passengers and a crew of four. A hydraulically operated cargo door is installed on the starboard side of the aircraft, and a ball roller cargo floor is capable of accommodating palletized cargo. The C-20G was operated by Fleet Logistics Support Squadron Four Eight (VR-48) at Naval Air Facility, Andrews Air Force Base, Maryland before its 2012 deactivation. It is operated by VMR Detachment Kaneohe Bay, Marine Corps Air Station Kaneohe Bay, Marine Corps Base Hawaii. The C-20G is also known as the "Grey Ghost"

The C-20H is a GIV-SP model operated by the U.S. Air Force in a command/executive transport role. The C-20J is a GIV-SP model operated by the U.S. Army in a command/executive transport role.

The United States Department of Defense C-20A/B/C/D/E aircraft are all Gulfstream III variants.

=== G350/G450 ===
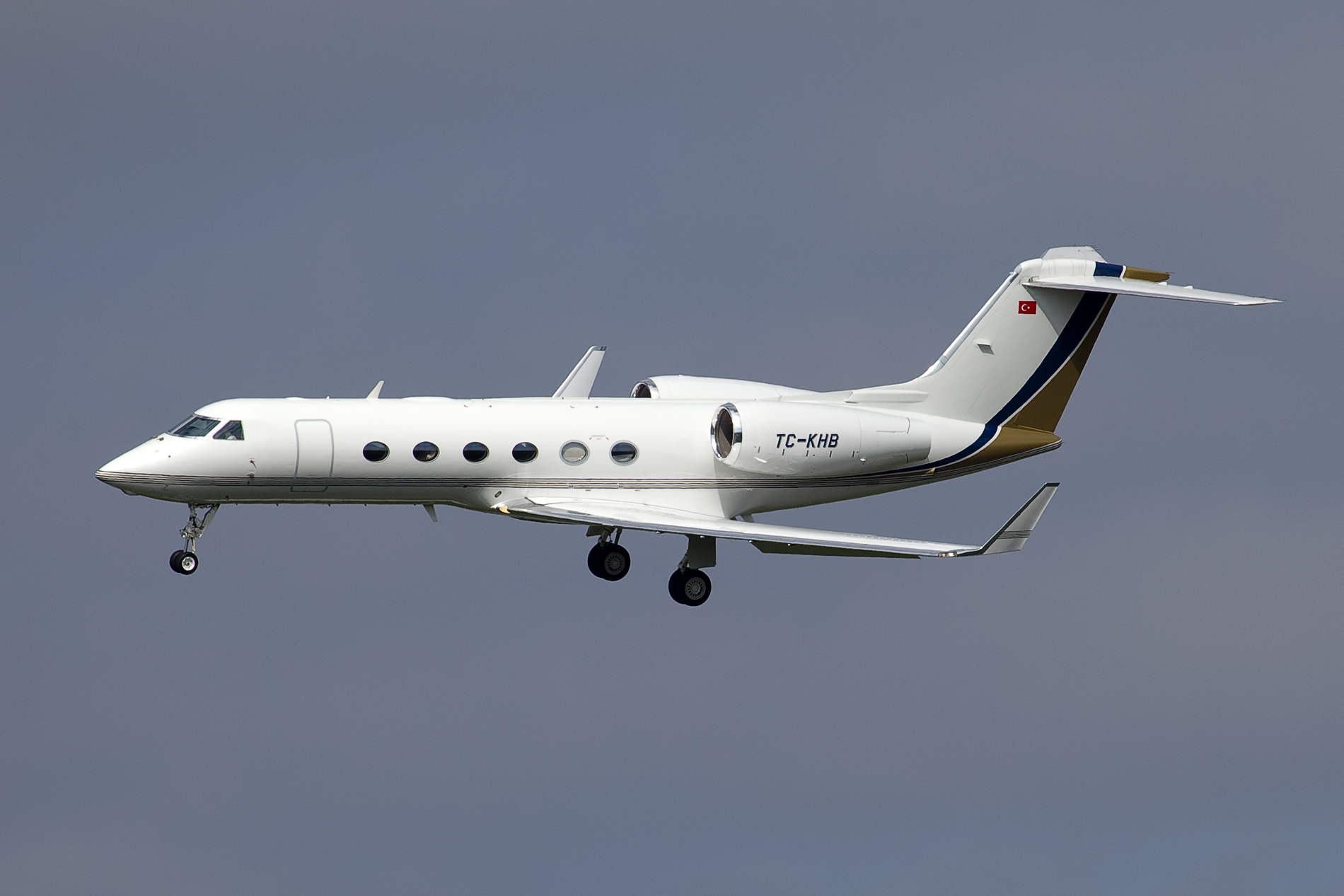
The G450 (GIV-X) is 12 in (30 cm) longer and the main door is moved aft; it has updated engines, flight deck and systems.

The G450 is a designation for the model GIV-X, approved by the FAA on August 12, 2004, as is the G350, which has a reduced fuel capacity. Compared to the Gulfstream IV, its fuselage is 12 in (300 mm) longer and the main entry door relocated aft. The Rolls-Royce Tay 611 engines are replaced by 611-8Cs with FADEC, redesigned thrust reversers, nacelles and pylons which increases range and payload, coupled with aerodynamic improvements. Many Gulfstream V-SP improvements are used: the Honeywell advanced flight deck display suite, electrical power generation, cabin temperature control and pressurization, nose and nose landing gear. It also has an improved APU and flap/stab actuation system, redesigned main landing gear wheels and brakes, flight control system hard-over protection system.

By the end of the G450 production run, 365 aircraft were produced, with prices ranging from $15 million to $32 million.

== Operators ==
=== Civil operators ===
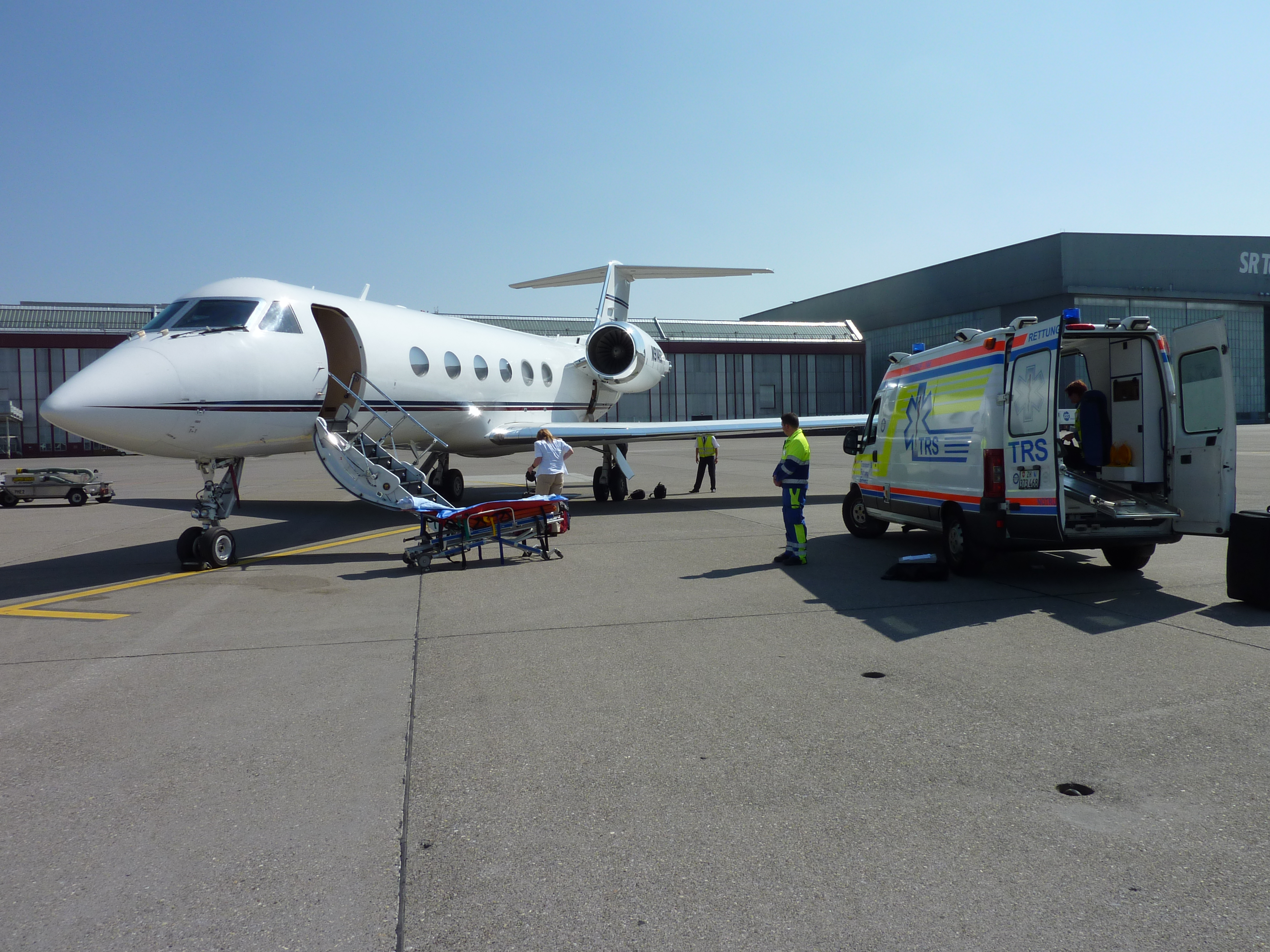
Gulfstream IV Air Ambulance

The aircraft is operated by private individuals, companies and executive charter operators, and in fractional ownership programs.

=== Government and military operators ===
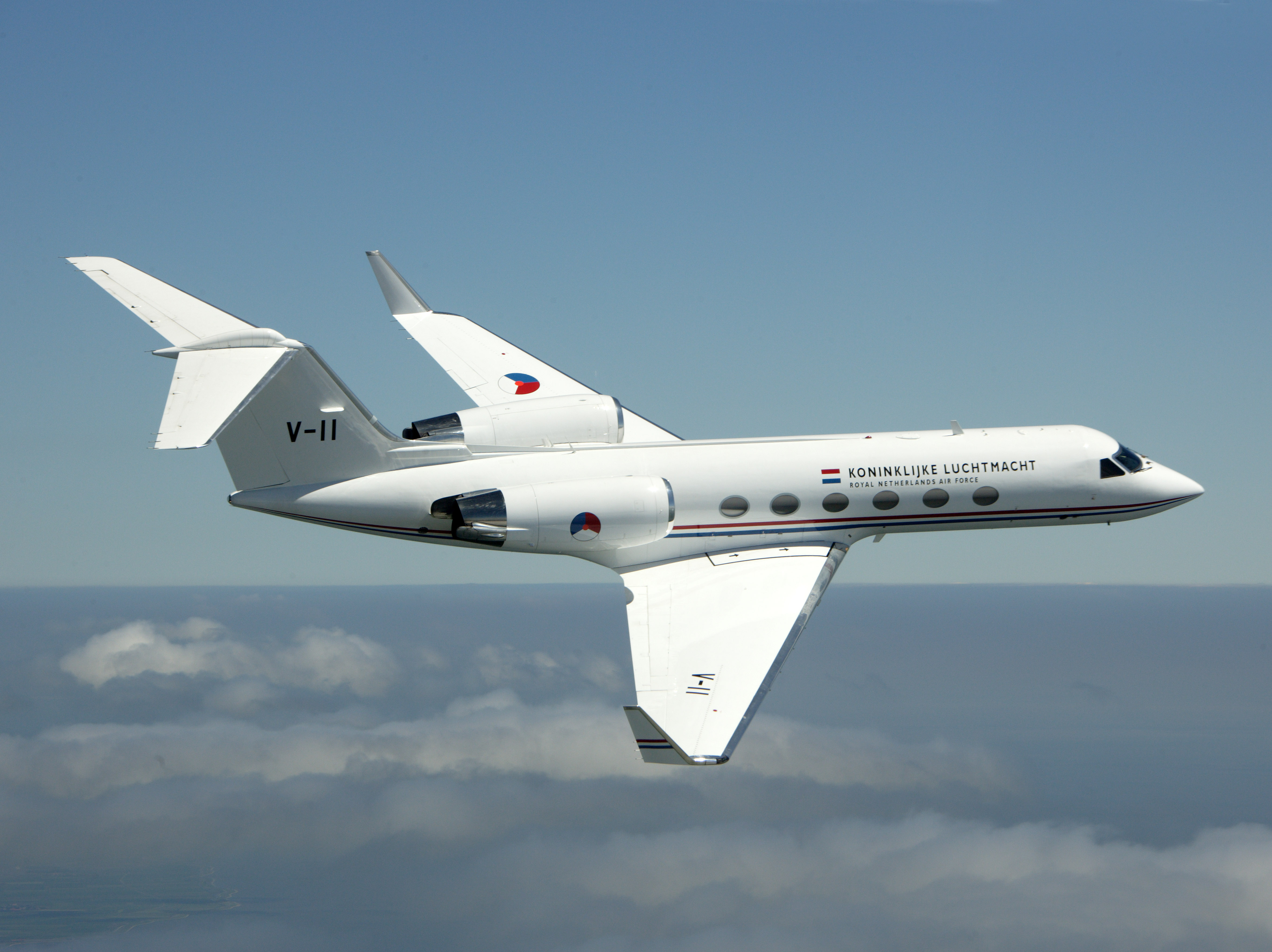
A Gulfstream IV of the Royal Netherlands Air Force

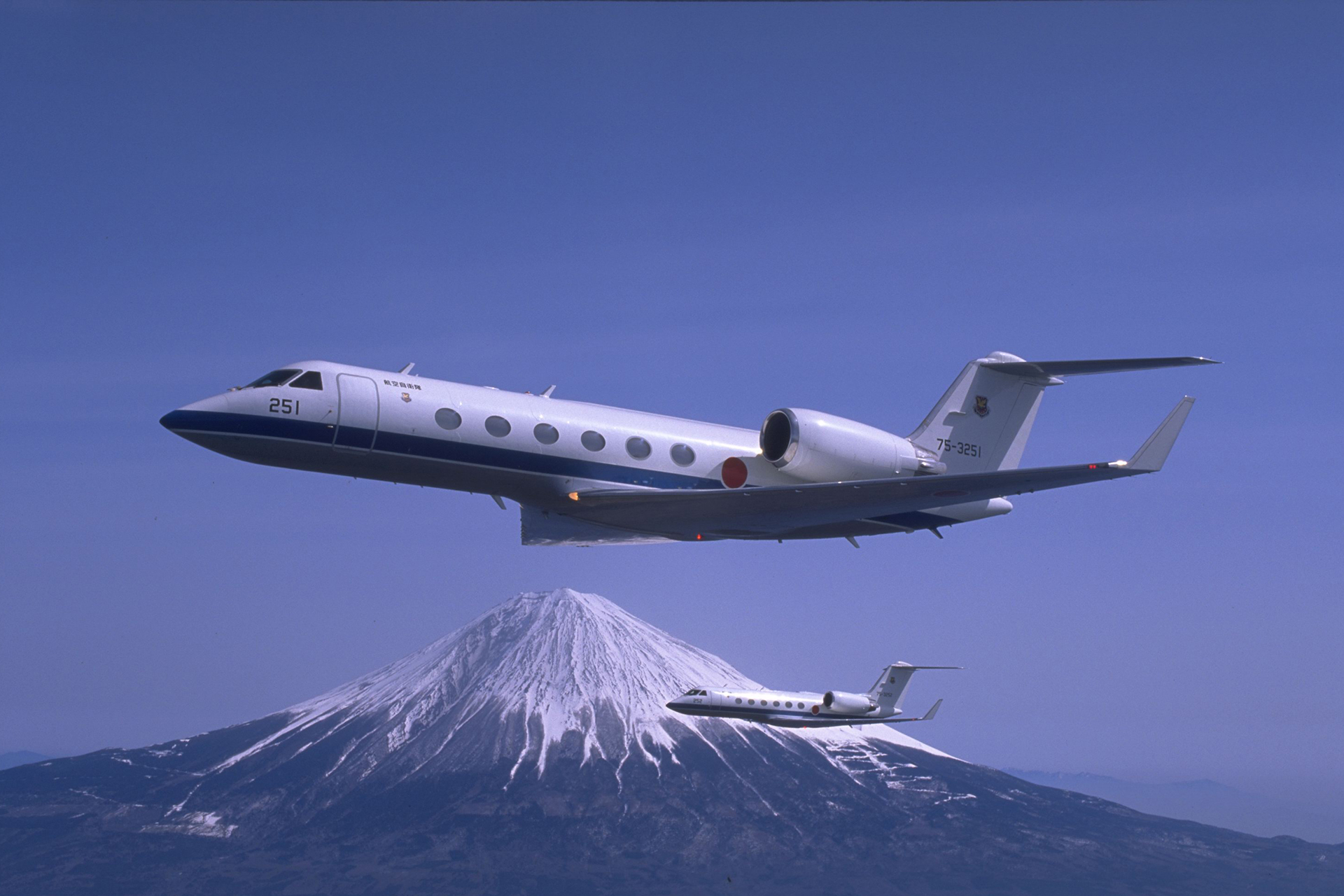
Japan Air Self-Defense Force U-4

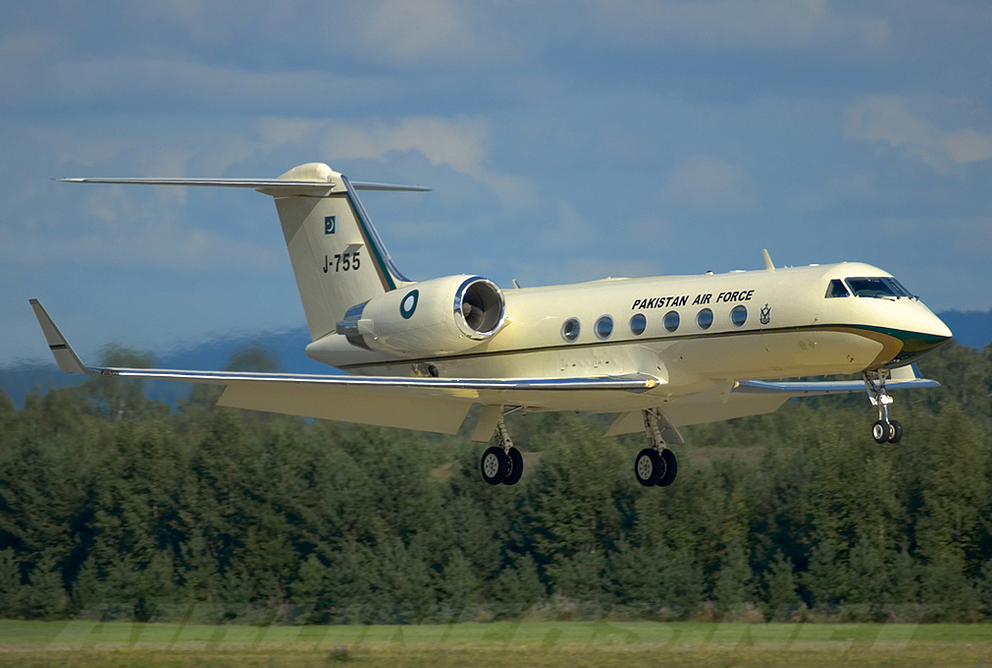
Pakistan Air Force G450

Brunei

- Sultan of Brunei

Chile

- Chilean Air Force

Ivory Coast

- Côte d'Ivoire Air Force

Japan

- Japan Air Self-Defense Force

Malaysia

- Sultan of Johor

Netherlands

- Royal Netherlands Air Force

Pakistan

- Pakistan Air Force
- Pakistan Army Aviation Corps

Saudi Arabia

- Royal Saudi Air Force

Sweden

- Swedish Air Force S102B Korpen electronic intelligence (ELINT) aircraft

Tanzania

- Tanzania Air Force Command

United States

- United States Air Force
- United States Army 1 Gulfstream IV (C-20F) as of January 2025
- United States Navy
- United States Marine Corps
- National Oceanic and Atmospheric Administration

=== Former military operators ===
Ireland

- The Irish Air Corps previously operated a G-IV as a government transport.

Uganda

- The Government of Uganda purchased one G-IV SP in December 2000 at a cost of US$31.5 million for Presidential flights. It was replaced in February 2009 by a G550.

== Specifications ==
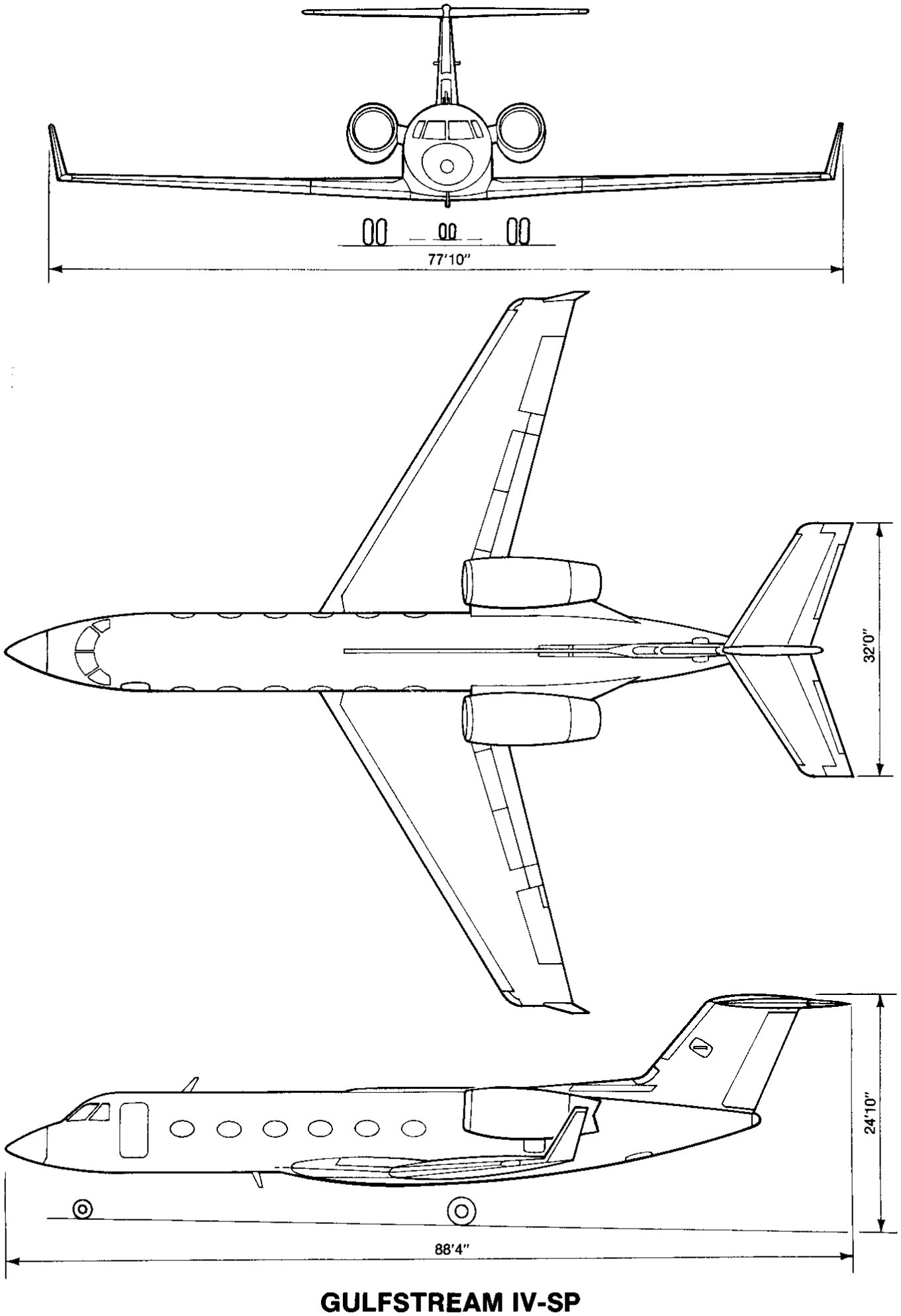
3-view line drawing of the Gulfstream IV-SP

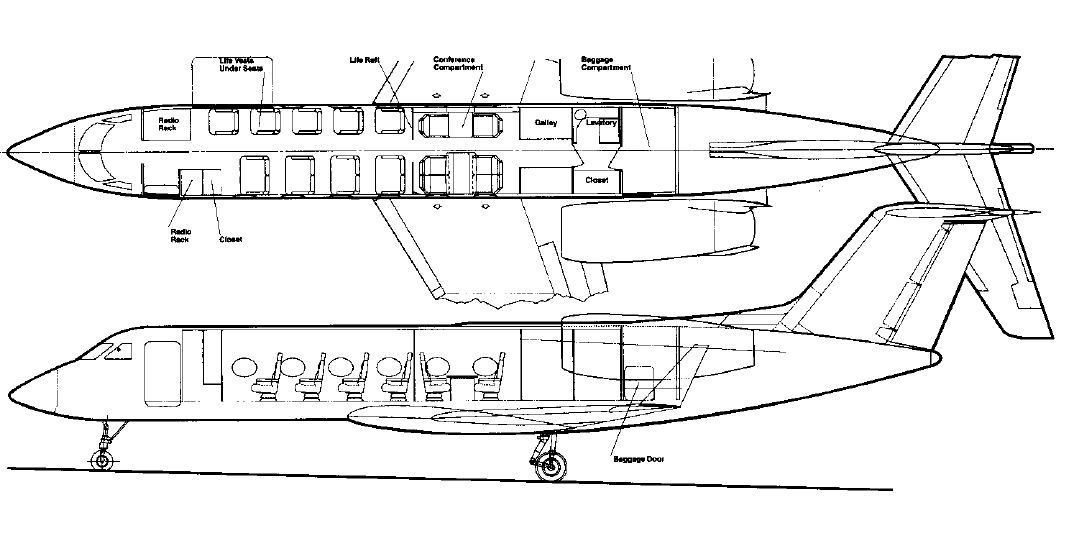
Passenger Layout

| Model | GIV | GIV-SP | G350 | G450 |
|---|---|---|---|---|
| Cockpit crew | Two | | | |
| Passengers | 19 | | | |
| Length | 88 ft 4 in (26.92 m) | | 89 ft 4 in (27.23 m) | |
| Wingspan | 77 ft 10 in (23.72 m) | | | |
| Wing area | 950.39 sq ft (88.3 m^{2}) | | | |
| Overall height | 24 ft 5 in (7.45 m) | | 25 ft 2 in (7.67 m) | |
| MTOW | 73,200 lb (33,203 kg) | 74,600 lb (33,838 kg) | 70,900 lb (32,160 kg) | 74,600 lb (33,838 kg) |
| Empty weight | 35,500 lb (16,103 kg) | | 42,700 lb (19,368 kg) | 43,000 lb (19,504 kg) |
| Cruising speed | Mach 0.80 – Mach 0.85 (459–488 kn; 850–903 km/h; 528–561 mph) | | | |
| Maximum speed | Mach 0.88 (505 kn; 935 km/h; 581 mph) | | | |
| Range | 4,220 nmi (7,815 km; 4,856 mi) | | 3,800 nmi (7,038 km; 4,373 mi) | 4,350 nmi (8,056 km; 5,006 mi) |
| Service ceiling | 45,000 ft (13,716 m) | | | |
| Engines (×2) | Rolls-Royce Tay 611-8 | | Rolls-Royce Tay 611-8C | |
| Thrust | 13,850 lbf (61.6 kN) | | | |

== See also ==
Related development

- Gulfstream III
- Gulfstream V
- Gulfstream G500/G550

Related lists

- List of active United States military aircraft
