= Joseph G. Galway =

American meteorologist (1922–1998)

Joe Galway
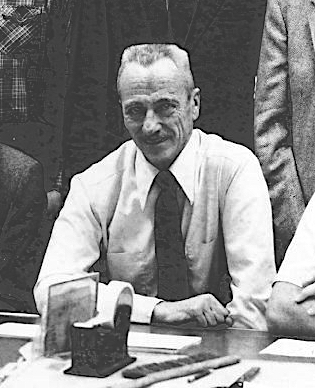
- Born: December 3, 1922; Cambridge, Massachusetts, US
- Died: June 29, 1998 (aged 75); Kansas City, Missouri, US
- Known for: Severe storms forecasting
- Scientific career
- Fields: Meteorology
- Institutions: National Severe Storms Forecast Center

Joseph G. Galway (December 3, 1922 – June 29, 1998), was an American meteorologist pioneering in the fields of severe convective storm forecasting and research. He was one of the first forecasters for the Severe Local Storms Unit and the National Severe Storms Forecast Center, and developed widely used synoptic (as well as mesoscale) predictors associated with severe thunderstorms and tornadoes, such as the jet streak and lifted index.

== Biography ==
Joseph G. Galway was born on December 3, 1922, in Cambridge, Massachusetts. His parents encouraged him to get a college education and he attended Boston College. Galway majored in mathematics and economics. He enrolled in the Army in the fall of 1940, with war imminent, and received a compressed formation in just 28 months in December 1942, preceding duty in the United States Army Air Forces. There, Galway was sent to Brown University for a 26-week pre-meteorology program then entered the 9-month cadet meteorology program at the Massachusetts Institute of Technology on October 4, 1943.

Galway graduated from June 5, 1944, and was sent as an air traffic controller in the Pacific theater where he kept notes with which he wrote Across the Pacific in 1947, but did not publish. After discharge from the air force in 1946, Galway returned to Boston College and completed his bachelor degree in economics in 1947 before enrolling at Babson Institute of Business Administration in Wellesley, Massachusetts.

Galway went back to the Massachusetts Institute of Technology afterward to take a refresher courses in meteorology in 1949 while applying for work as a Weather Bureau forecaster. In 1950, he worked at Woods Hole Oceanographic Institution but by December 1950, he was offered a job at Jacksonville, Florida by the Bureau and reported there on February 1, 1951. In the spring of 1952, U.S. Weather Bureau Chief Francis Reichelderfer formed a special unit on severe storms forecasting following the success of the first successful forecast of a tornado at Tinker Air Force Base in Oklahoma City on 25 March 1948. Joseph Galway was the first bureau forecaster to accept assignment to this unit that became known as Severe Local Storms Unit. The group of five forecasters was trained by members of the Weather Bureau and Army Navy Analysis Unit on forecasting rules.

The Severe Local Storms Unit forecasters worked on shift to issue bulletins and warnings but were also encouraged to spend time on research projects during low convection seasons. Galway’s research began in the mid-1950s and continued until his retirement in 1984. He was a forecaster from 1952 to 1965 and from 1972 to 1984 with a break to be the Deputy Director of the center, by then named National Severe Storms Forecast Center. Some of his early contributions were: the lifted index, and the relationship between the upper-level jet and tornadoes.

Besides his contributions to meteorology, Galway has written on the history of severe weather forecasting in the United States. Joseph G. Galway died in Kansas City, Missouri on June 29, 1998.

== Bibliography ==
- Galway, J. G. (1956). "The lifted index as a predictor of latent instability". Bull. Amer. Meteor. Soc. 37 (10): 528–529. doi:10.1175/1520-0477-37.10.528.
- Galway, J. G. (1966). "The Topeka tornado of 8 June 1966". Weatherwise. 19 (4): 144–149. doi:10.1080/00431672.1966.9930516.
- Galway, J. G. (1977). "Some climatological aspects of tornado outbreaks". Mon. Wea. Rev. 105 (4): 477–484. doi:10.1175/1520-0493(1977)105<0477:SCAOTO>2.0.CO;2.
- Galway, J. G. (1985). "J.P. Finley: The first severe storms forecaster". Bull. Amer. Meteor. Soc. 66 (11): 1389–1395. doi:10.1175/1520-0477(1985)066<1389:JFTFSS>2.0.CO;2.
- Galway, J. G. (1989). "The evolution of severe thunderstorm criteria with the weather service". Wea. Forecasting. 4 (4): 585–592. doi:10.1175/1520-0434(1989)004<0585:TEOSTC>2.0.CO;2.
- Galway, J. G. (1992). "Early severe thunderstorm forecasting and research by the United States Weather Bureau". Wea. Forecasting. 7 (4): 564–587. doi:10.1175/1520-0434(1992)007<0564:ESTFAR>2.0.CO;2.
- Galway, J. G.; Pearson, A. (1981). "Winter tornado outbreaks". Mon. Wea. Rev. 109 (5): 1072–1080. doi:10.1175/1520-0493(1981)109<1072:WTO>2.0.CO;2.

== See also ==
- Storm Prediction Center
- John E. Hales, Jr.
- Larry Wilson (meteorologist)
- Robert H. Johns
- Robert C. Miller
