= Robert H. Johns =

American meteorologist (1942–2020)

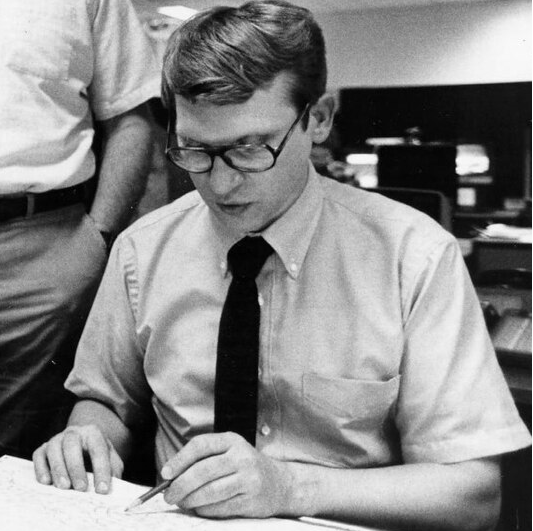
- At SELS Shift Briefing in 1984
- Born: October 30, 1942; Lebanon, Indiana, U.S.
- Died: October 26, 2020 (aged 77)
- Education: Purdue University, University of Oklahoma
- Known for: Severe storms forecasting
- Awards: US Department of Commerce Silver Medal & the Dr. T. Theodore Fujita Research Achievement Award
- Scientific career
- Fields: Meteorology
- Workplaces: National Weather Service, Storm Prediction Center

Robert H. "Bob" Johns (October 30, 1942 – October 26, 2020) was an American meteorologist specializing in severe convective storms and tornadoes.

Johns grew up in Terhune, Indiana, where his father ran the general store. His childhood included observing weather and developing his intense interest in meteorology. He attended Purdue University earning a B.S (1962), then earning an M.S in meteorology from the University of Oklahoma (OU; 1965).

== Early career ==
Johns spent the summers of 1962–1964 as a student trainee for the U.S. Weather Bureau (USWB) offices in Indianapolis, Indiana, and Chicago, Illinois. After graduating from OU, he began full-time federal service as a meteorologist in Fort Wayne, Indiana, in 1965.

Due to the Vietnam war, Johns served as an officer in the U.S. Coast and Geodetic Survey from March 1966 to late 1969. Afterward, he returned to his meteorologist job with the USWB, taking a position at the forecast office in Kansas City, Missouri. Johns remained in this position until May 1971, when he transferred into the National Severe Storms Forecast Center (NSSFC).

== SPC career ==
Johns entered NSSFC in 1971 as a meteorological assistant. He was promoted to a SELS Assistant forecaster in 1974, and began issuing convective outlooks for the contiguous United States. Then in 1979, Johns was promoted to a national lead forecaster. He remained in that position until 1994, when he became the first Science and Operations Officer for the Storm Prediction Center (SPC). Johns retired from the SPC in 2001.

== Retirement ==
After he retired in 2001, Johns started working on a project reanalyzing the Tri-State Tornado. Johns died on October 26, 2020.

== Research ==
Johns furthered forecasting techniques and developed the modern conceptualization of the derecho following landmark work on "northwest flow" severe weather patterns. Johns also issued the first enhanced wording "Particularly Dangerous Situation" (PDS) for tornado watches during the April 2–3, 1982 tornado outbreak.

== Awards ==
Johns was recognized for his exemplary public service and received a number of honors for outstanding performance. These include:

- 1982 Silver Medal (Joint Organization Award) – For exemplary service during the tornado outbreak of April 2–3, 1982
- 1997 Elected Fellow of American Meteorological Society
- 2001 Silver Medal (Joint Organization Award) – “For providing the citizens of Alabama life-saving tornado watch and warning information during the tornado outbreak of December 16, 2000.”
- 2001 Dr. T. Theodore Fujita Research Achievement Award from the National Weather Association

== See also ==
- Storm Prediction Center
- John E. Hales, Jr.
- Joseph G. Galway
- Larry Wilson (meteorologist)
- Robert C. Miller
