= Larry Wilson (meteorologist) =

American meteorologist

Larry F. Wilson
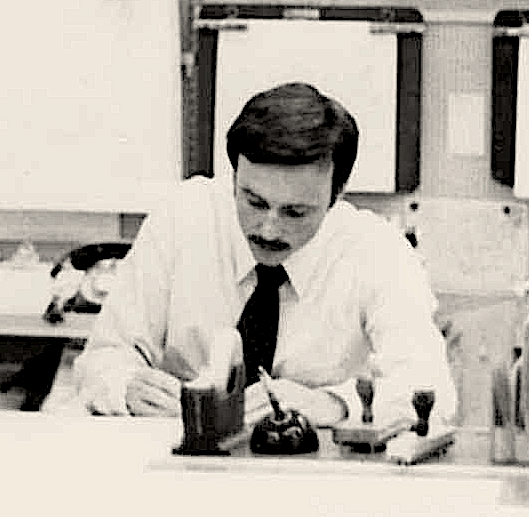
- Wilson in 1976
- Born: December 8, 1937 (age 88); Chatham County, North Carolina, US
- Education: Florida State University
- Known for: Severe storms forecasting
- Scientific career
- Fields: Meteorology
- Workplaces: Severe Weather Warning Center, National Severe Storms Forecast Center, Storm Prediction Center

Larry F. Wilson (born 8 December 1937) is an American meteorologist who specializes in the forecasting of severe convective storms. For many years Wilson served as a lead forecaster at the National Severe Storms Forecast Center (NSSFC; predecessor to today’s Storm Prediction Center) in Kansas City, Missouri. As a U.S. Air Force (USAF) meteorologist in the mid-1960s, Wilson is one of only two NSSFC forecasters to have ever worked directly with severe weather forecasting pioneer Colonel Robert C. Miller (1920-1998).

== Biography ==
Wilson was born in Chatham County, North Carolina, and grew up in the rural community of Wilsonville. He graduated class valedictorian from nearby Pittsboro High School in 1956. Wilson then attended North Carolina State University before graduating from Florida State University in 1961. Upon completing the U. S. Air Force’s Officer’s Training School, Wilson served at Pope Field, North Carolina. He was part of a top-secret Air Force mission deployed to Sanford Air Force Base, Florida during the Cuban Missile Crisis of October 1962. Wilson was sent to the Air Force’s Saigon Forecast Center in Vietnam the following year. While there, he avoided injury when a Viet Cong bomb detonated in a Saigon theatre frequented by Americans. Upon returning to the U.S. in 1964, Wilson was assigned to the Air Force’s Military Weather Warning Center (MWWC), then in Kansas City, Missouri, where he worked alongside Colonel Robert C. Miller (see first image below). Miller, along with USAF Major Ernest J. Fawbush, in the late 1940s developed the pioneering weather analysis and forecast techniques that remain the basis of severe weather forecasting today. Wilson applied and refined Fawbush and Miller’s techniques for civilian use, adapting the techniques for the issuance of United States Weather Bureau / National Weather Service tornado watches.

It was at the MWWC that Wilson especially honed his meteorological skills. He became a protégé of Col. Miller and an advocate of Miller’s renowned severe weather analysis and forecast techniques. Wilson joined the “SELS” (Severe Local Storms) unit of the NSSFC as an assistant forecaster in 1969 and was selected as meteorologist-in-charge of the Weather Service’s newly formed Regional Warning Coordination Center in 1973. Wilson became an NSSFC lead forecaster in 1975, a position he held until retiring from U.S. federal service in 1994. As a lead forecaster, Wilson issued nearly 1800 tornado and severe thunderstorm watches that contained 15,000 severe weather reports — more than 1600 of which were tornadoes. As a SELS lead forecaster, Wilson also worked with noted SELS forecasters Joseph G. Galway and Robert H. Johns. After leaving the NSSFC, Wilson remained in Kansas City, serving as a private sector meteorologist for Global Weather Services, and for Weather or Not, Inc.

Wilson, a recipient of the U.S. Department of Commerce’s Silver Medal Award (1982) and the American Meteorological Society’s “Exceptional Prediction Award” (1990), is a Fellow of the American Meteorological Society and a member of the National Weather Association. Wilson also was a three-day contestant on the NBC television game show Concentration in November 1964, where he won two games.

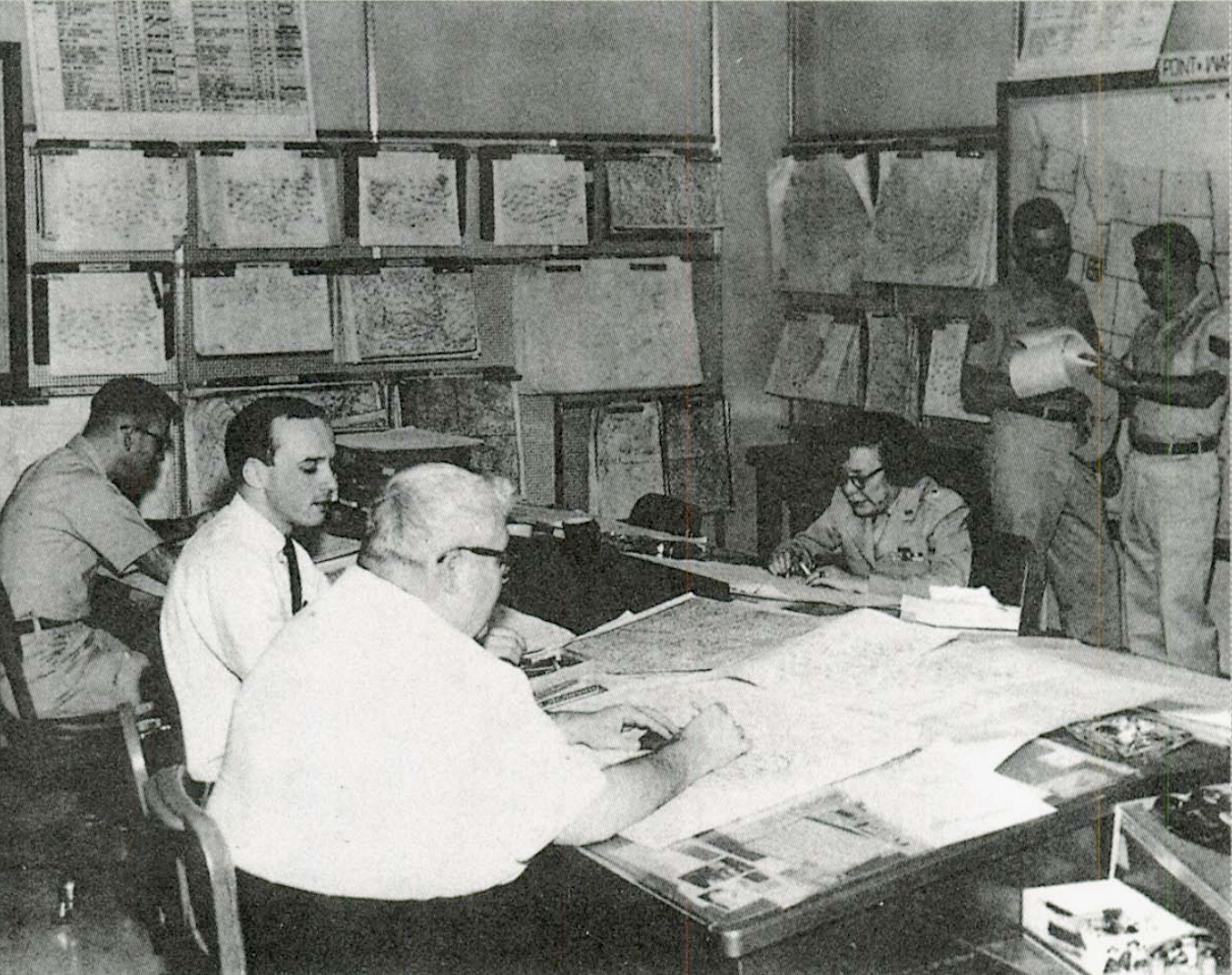

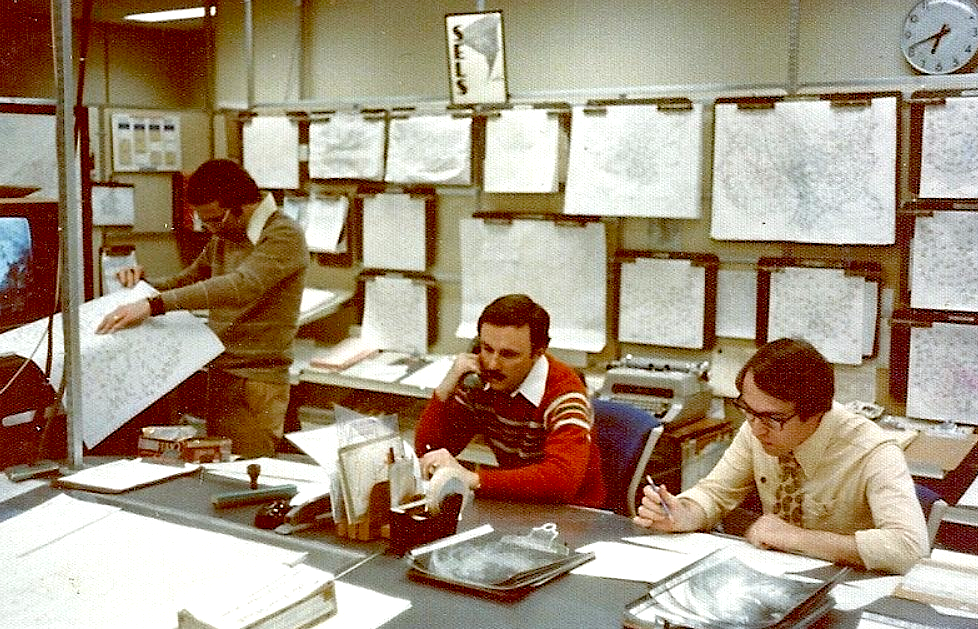

== See also ==
- Storm Prediction Center
- John E. Hales, Jr.
- Joseph G. Galway
- Robert H. Johns
- Robert C. Miller
