= Particularly dangerous situation =

Storm warning phrase

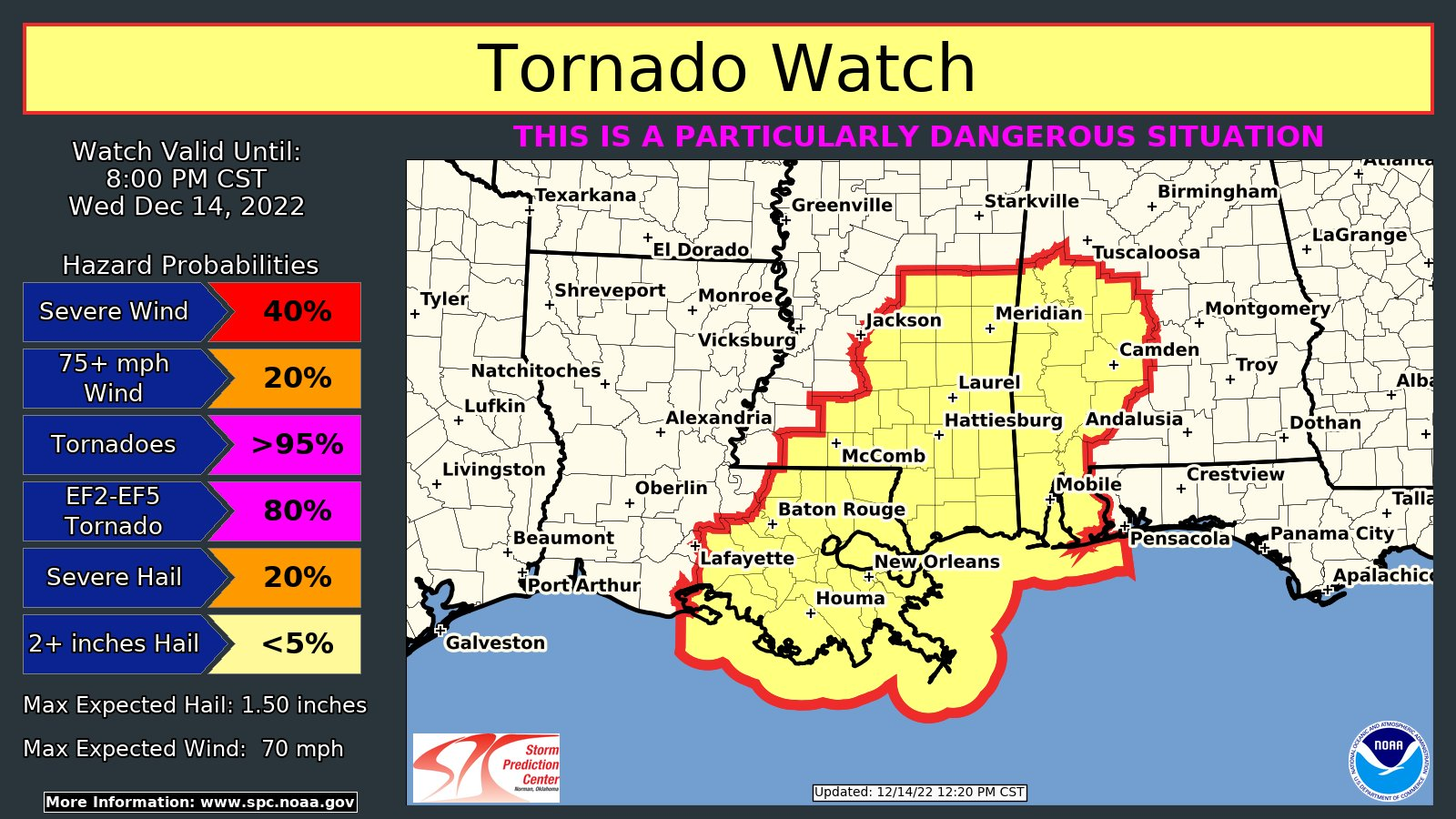
A PDS tornado watch issued on December 14, 2022.

In weather forecasting in the United States, "particularly dangerous situation" (PDS) is wording occasionally used by the National Weather Service in their watch and warning messages to convey heightened urgency for a severe weather event that is unusually and particularly extreme and life-threatening compared to the norm for the type of event. It is used in the format "This is a particularly dangerous situation..." at the discretion of the issuing forecaster. A watch or warning bearing the phrase is referred to as a PDS watch or PDS warning.

First used by the Storm Prediction Center (SPC), a national guidance center of the National Weather Service, for tornado watches, the phrase was later applied to other severe weather watches and warnings by the agency's regional forecast offices. It is most commonly used for major tornado outbreaks or long-lived, extreme derecho events, and has been used for non-convective weather hazards such as exceptional flash flooding, or a wildfire.

PDS watches and warnings are uncommon. From 1996 to 2005, the SPC issued an average of 24 per year, less than 3% of all watches. When a PDS watch is issued, there are often more PDS watches issued for the same weather system, even on the same day during major outbreaks, so the number of days per year that a PDS watch is issued is significantly lower.

== Background ==
During the winter of 1981–82, the Severe Local Storms (SELS) unit switched to a more flexible method of issuing weather products. Ed Ferguson, Deputy Director of the National Severe Storms Forecast Center (NSSFC), suggested to Lead Forecaster Jack Hales that the guidance center could give more resolution to the tornado watch product. Hales suggested the PDS option to identify areas where, a few times each year, conditions are most likely to aid in the development of large and intense tornadoes. The first PDS tornado watch was issued by Robert H. Johns for the April 2, 1982 tornado outbreak across the southern and central Great Plains.

While historically applied only to severe thunderstorm, tornado and flash flood watches (i.e., severe local storm "polygonal" events), PDS wording could theoretically be applied to other types of weather watches (such as winter storm, high wind, hurricane, or fire weather watches) when an enhanced threat for such conditions exists. These watches have generally (but not always) been issued during a high risk or an upper-end moderate risk either of severe storms from the SPC's convective outlooks or of flash flooding from the Weather Prediction Center (WPC)'s excessive rainfall outlooks.

On April 24, 2011, the National Weather Service Weather Forecast Office in Memphis, Tennessee, issued the first PDS flash flood watch to highlight the threat for widespread, significant, and potentially life-threatening flash flooding due to repeated rounds of severe thunderstorms.

On December 19, 2017, and August 3, 2018, the National Weather Service Weather Forecast Office in Reno, Nevada, issued PDS red flag warnings to highlight the threat for potentially life-threatening fire danger due to strong gusty winds and low humidity.

== Issuance ==
=== PDS flash flood watch ===
PDS flash flood watches were issued when there is a higher-than-normal risk of widespread, life-threatening flash flooding. These watches are issued by local NWS Weather Forecast Offices, not the Storm Prediction Center. This would eventually go onto be replaced by the flood watch in 2021.

Below is the first PDS flash flood watch, which was issued by the National Weather Service Forecast Office in Memphis, Tennessee, on April 24, 2011, as mentioned above.

URGENT - IMMEDIATE BROADCAST REQUESTED

FLOOD WATCH NATIONAL WEATHER SERVICE MEMPHIS TN 239 PM CDT SUN APR 24 2011

...VERY HEAVY RAINFALL THROUGH THE MIDDLE OF THIS WEEK WILL LIKELY LEAD TO SIGNIFICANT...WIDESPREAD FLASH FLOODING...

...THIS IS A PARTICULARLY DANGEROUS SITUATION...

A BOUNDARY WILL CONTINUE TO REMAIN STATIONARY ACROSS SOUTHERN MISSOURI INTO KENTUCKY THROUGH MONDAY. REPEATED ROUNDS OF THUNDERSTORMS WILL TRACK ALONG THE FRONT BRINGING HEAVY RAINFALL. THEN A LOW PRESSURE SYSTEM WILL TRACK ALONG IT INTO MISSOURI AND PUSH THE FRONT FURTHER SOUTH TO ALONG THE I-40 CORRIDOR MONDAY NIGHT THROUGH TUESDAY NIGHT. THIS WILL SHIFT THE HEAVY RAIN AXIS FURTHER SOUTH TO ALONG AND JUST NORTH OF THE I-40 CORRIDOR.

A SECOND LOW PRESSURE SYSTEM WILL TRACK ALONG THE NEWLY STALLED BOUNDARY AND SET OFF ADDITIONAL TRAINING THUNDERSTORMS LATE TUESDAY NIGHT AND WEDNESDAY. THE FINAL COLD FRONT WILL PASS THROUGH LATE WEDNESDAY AFTERNOON...ENDING THE PERSISTENT HEAVY RAINFALL.

ARZ026>028-035-036-048-049-058-MSZ001>014-TNZ003-004-019>021- 048>055-088>092-250400- /O.NEW.KMEG.FF.A.0007.110426T0000Z-110428T0000Z/ /00000.0.ER.000000T0000Z.000000T0000Z.000000T0000Z.OO/ CRAIGHEAD-POINSETT-MISSISSIPPI-CROSS- CRITTENDEN-ST. FRANCIS- LEE AR-PHILLIPS-DESOTO-MARSHALL-BENTON MS-TIPPAH-ALCORN- TISHOMINGO-TUNICA-TATE-PRENTISS- COAHOMA-QUITMAN-PANOLA-LAFAYETTE-

UNION-WEAKLEY-HENRY-DYER-GIBSON-CARROLL-LAUDERDALE-TIPTON-HAYWOOD- CROCKETT-MADISON-CHESTER-HENDERSON- DECATUR-SHELBY-FAYETTE- HARDEMAN-MCNAIRY-HARDIN- INCLUDING THE CITIES OF...JONESBORO...HARRISBURG...BLYTHEVILLE... WYNNE...WEST MEMPHIS...FORREST CITY...HELENA... SOUTHAVEN... OLIVE BRANCH...CORINTH...IUKA...TUNICA...BOONEVILLE... CLARKSDALE...BATESVILLE...OXFORD...NEW ALBANY... MARTIN... DRESDEN...PARIS...DYERSBURG...HUMBOLDT...MILAN...HUNTINGDON... COVINGTON...JACKSON...LEXINGTON...BARTLETT...GERMANTOWN... COLLIERVILLE...MEMPHIS...MILLINGTON...SOMERVILLE... BOLIVAR... SAVANNAH 239 PM CDT SUN APR 24 2011

...FLASH FLOOD WATCH IN EFFECT FROM MONDAY EVENING THROUGH WEDNESDAY EVENING...

THE NATIONAL WEATHER SERVICE IN MEMPHIS HAS ISSUED A

* FLASH FLOOD WATCH FOR PORTIONS OF EAST ARKANSAS...NORTH MISSISSIPPI AND WEST TENNESSEE...INCLUDING THE FOLLOWING AREAS...IN EAST ARKANSAS...CRAIGHEAD...CRITTENDEN...CROSS... LEE...MISSISSIPPI...PHILLIPS...POINSETT AND ST. FRANCIS. IN NORTH MISSISSIPPI...ALCORN...BENTON...COAHOMA...DESOTO... LAFAYETTE...MARSHALL...PANOLA...PRENTISS...QUITMAN...TATE... TIPPAH...TISHOMINGO...TUNICA AND UNION. IN WEST TENNESSEE... CARROLL...CHESTER...CROCKETT...DECATUR...DYER...FAYETTE... GIBSON...HARDEMAN...HARDIN...HAYWOOD...HENDERSON...HENRY... LAUDERDALE...MADISON...MCNAIRY...SHELBY...TIPTON AND WEAKLEY.

* FROM MONDAY EVENING THROUGH WEDNESDAY EVENING. * THIS IS A PARTICULARLY DANGEROUS SITUATION * TOTAL RAINFALL AMOUNTS OF 5 TO 8 INCHES ARE EXPECTED ALONG AND NORTH OF I-40 WITH 2 TO 5 INCHES EXPECTED SOUTH OF I-40. LOCALLY HIGHER AMOUNTS ARE LIKELY.

* RAINFALL AMOUNTS SUCH AS THESE MAY LEAD TO WIDESPREAD... SIGNIFICANT...AND LIFE THREATENING FLASH FLOODING. THIS EVENT MAY BE AS SEVERE AS THE MAY 1–2, 2010 FLOODING IN PLACES. FLASH FLOODING OF CITIES...RURAL AREAS...RIVERS...AND SMALL STREAMS ARE POSSIBLE.

PRECAUTIONARY/PREPAREDNESS ACTIONS...

A FLASH FLOOD WATCH MEANS THAT CONDITIONS MAY DEVELOP THAT LEAD TO FLASH FLOODING. FLASH FLOODING IS A VERY DANGEROUS SITUATION.

YOU SHOULD MONITOR LATER FORECASTS AND BE PREPARED TO TAKE ACTION SHOULD FLASH FLOOD WARNINGS BE ISSUED.

&&

$$

ARZ008-009-017-018-MOZ113-115-TNZ001-002-250400- /O.EXT.KMEG.FF.A.0006.000000T0000Z-110428T0000Z/ /00000.0.ER.000000T0000Z.000000T0000Z.000000T0000Z.OO/ RANDOLPH-CLAY-LAWRENCE-GREENE-DUNKLIN-PEMISCOT-LAKE-OBION- INCLUDING THE CITIES OF...WALNUT RIDGE...PARAGOULD...KENNETT... CARUTHERSVILLE...UNION CITY 239 PM CDT SUN APR 24 2011

...FLASH FLOOD WATCH NOW IN EFFECT THROUGH WEDNESDAY EVENING...

THE FLASH FLOOD WATCH IS NOW IN EFFECT FOR

* PORTIONS OF EAST ARKANSAS...SOUTHEAST MISSOURI AND WEST TENNESSEE...INCLUDING THE FOLLOWING AREAS...IN EAST ARKANSAS... CLAY...GREENE...LAWRENCE AND RANDOLPH. IN SOUTHEAST MISSOURI... DUNKLIN AND PEMISCOT. IN WEST TENNESSEE...LAKE AND OBION.

* THROUGH WEDNESDAY EVENING. * THIS IS A PARTICULARLY DANGEROUS SITUATION * ADDITIONAL RAINFALL AMOUNTS OF 6 TO 9 INCHES ARE EXPECTED. LOCALLY HIGHER AMOUNTS ARE LIKELY. THIS...IN COMBINATION OF THE 2 TO 4 INCHES THAT HAVE ALREADY FALLEN MAY LEAD TO TOTAL RAINFALL AMOUNTS IN EXCESS OF 12 INCHES IN MANY LOCATIONS.

* RAINFALL AMOUNTS SUCH AS THESE WILL LIKELY LEAD TO WIDESPREAD... SIGNIFICANT...AND LIFE THREATENING FLASH FLOODING. THIS EVENT MAY BE AS SEVERE AS THE MAY 1-2 2010 FLOODING IN MANY PLACES. FLASH FLOODING OF CITIES...RURAL AREAS...RIVERS...AND SMALL STREAMS ARE POSSIBLE.

PRECAUTIONARY/PREPAREDNESS ACTIONS...

A FLASH FLOOD WATCH MEANS THAT CONDITIONS MAY DEVELOP THAT LEAD TO FLASH FLOODING. FLASH FLOODING IS A VERY DANGEROUS SITUATION.

YOU SHOULD MONITOR LATER FORECASTS AND BE PREPARED TO TAKE ACTION SHOULD FLASH FLOOD WARNINGS BE ISSUED.

&&

$$

BORGHOFF

=== PDS flash flood warning ===
PDS flash flood warnings are issued when there is a higher than normal risk of widespread, life-threatening flash flooding. Like PDS flash flood watches, they are issued by the local NWS Weather Forecast Offices, rather than the Storm Prediction Center. Recently, they have been issued as PDS flash flood emergencies, most notably by the National Weather Service offices in Houston and Corpus Christi, Texas.

This strongly-worded flash flood emergency was issued on September 27, 2024, by the National Weather Service Forecast Office in Greenville–Spartanburg, South Carolina, in response to devastating flooding in western North Carolina caused by Hurricane Helene.

.

894 WGUS52 KGSP 272323 FFWGSP NCC023-027-111-291800- /O.NEW.KGSP.FF.W.0113.240927T2323Z-240929T1800Z/ /00000.0.ER.000000T0000Z.000000T0000Z.000000T0000Z.OO/

BULLETIN - EAS ACTIVATION REQUESTED Flash Flood Warning National Weather Service Greenville-Spartanburg SC 723 PM EDT Fri Sep 27 2024

...FLASH FLOOD EMERGENCY FOR CATAWBA RIVER FROM LAKE JAMES TO LAKE RHODHISS...

The National Weather Service in Greenville-Spartanburg has issued a

* Flash Flood Warning for... Central Burke County in western North Carolina... Southeastern Caldwell County in western North Carolina... East Central McDowell County in western North Carolina...

* Until 200 PM EDT Sunday.

* At 723 PM EDT, Devastating rainfall of 6-25 (twenty-five) inches occurred from Wednesday evening through Friday morning from Lake Hickory to the Catawba River headwaters, with the highest totals exceeding 2 feet along the Blue Ridge Escarpment across the upper Catawba River watershed. This is resulting in catastrophic and historic inflows into Lake James, and releases from Lake James are causing catastrophic flooding along the Catawba River into Lake Rhodhiss.

* The latest pool elevations for the upper Catawba River lakes are as follows (Full Pool is 100.0 feet):

Lake James: 110.3 feet and rising steadily. RECORD BROKEN. Lake Rhodhiss: 108.1 feet and rising steadily.

* The former record pool elevation at Lake James is 107.36 feet which occurred in September 8, 2004 during Hurricane Frances. Major Flood Stage is 110.0 feet.

* The current record pool elevation at Lake Rhodhiss is 110.10 feet which occurred in August 1940. Major Flood Stage is 110.0 feet.

* This is an unprecedented and extremely dangerous event. Residents are urged to heed guidance from emergency management and law enforcement on any potential impacts to property. We are pleading with drivers to heed any barricades and avoid all flooded areas. There have been numerous swift water rescues because people are choosing to risk their lives and the lives of others by failing to Turn Around Don't Drown. Please do the right thing and protect your life, the life of your family, and the lives of those who risk theirs to save you.

This is a FLASH FLOOD EMERGENCY for Catawba River from Lake James to Lake Rhodhiss. This is a PARTICULARLY DANGEROUS SITUATION. SEEK HIGHER GROUND NOW!

HAZARD...Life-threatening flash flooding from historic rainfall and resultant dam floodgate releases.

SOURCE...Duke Energy and Burke County Emergency Management.

IMPACT...This is a PARTICULARLY DANGEROUS SITUATION. SEEK HIGHER GROUND NOW! Life-threatening flash-flooding of Lake James, the Catawba River, and Lake Rhodhiss is ongoing. Structural flooding along Lake James continues and is developing along Lake Rhodhiss. Downstream of Bridgewater Dam on the Catawba River, several structrues are damaged or destroyed, with some single-level homes submerged by floodwaters. These floodwaters are causing numerous swift-water rescues. Backwater effects are causing significant inundation along tributaries, including flooding exceeding 4 ft deep at the NC 18/US 64 bridge, blocking a primary roadway connecting Morganton and Lenoir.

* Please stay weather aware and monitor lake levels and Duke Energy projections closely for any changes.

* For more information on lake levels or dam releases, people are encouraged to visit https://lakes.duke-energy.com or call 1-800-829-5253.

* Residents along the Catawba River are encouraged to stay aware of the latest updates from Burke County by signing up for alerts at: http://smart911.com

* McDowell County Emergency Management, Burke County Emergency Management, Caldwell County Emergency Management, and Duke Energy are closely monitoring these high flows and pool levels and additional updates will be provided as new information becomes available.

PRECAUTIONARY/PREPAREDNESS ACTIONS...

Move to higher ground now! This is an extremely dangerous and life-threatening situation. Do not attempt to travel unless you are fleeing an area subject to flooding or under an evacuation order.

If you are in low-lying areas along the Catawba River you should move to higher ground immediately.

&&

LAT...LON 3583 8188 3577 8179 3584 8164 3581 8159 3581 8146 3578 8135 3573 8139 3574 8143 3574 8159 3571 8176 3572 8194 3568 8202 3572 8206 3580 8191

FLASH FLOOD...OBSERVED FLASH FLOOD DAMAGE THREAT...CATASTROPHIC

$$

JMP

=== PDS flood watch ===
A PDS flood watch is issued by the National Weather Service when significant and widespread flooding is likely, and will cause a high threat to life and/or property.

The first known flood watch was issued in mid-February 2025 across parts of Kentucky, Missouri, Illinois, and Indiana, prompted by the February 2025 North American storm complex, which caused widespread catastrophic and deadly flooding across much of the area.

416

WGUS63 KPAH 141851 FFAPAH

Flood Watch National Weather Service Paducah KY 1251 PM CST Fri Feb 14 2025

.Rainfall is expected to begin before dawn Saturday increasing in intensity through the day. Thunderstorms are then expected to form in the late morning and persist through the evening. A large area of 4+ inches of rain is forecast. The region should prepare for an unusually dangerous and impactful flood event.

ILZ090-091-094-INZ088-KYZ001>022-MOZ112-114-150600- /O.CON.KPAH.FA.A.0002.250215T0600Z-250216T1200Z/ /00000.0.ER.000000T0000Z.000000T0000Z.000000T0000Z.OO/ Pope-Hardin-Massac-Spencer-Fulton-Hickman-Carlisle-Ballard- McCracken-Graves-Livingston-Marshall-Calloway-Crittenden-Lyon- Trigg-Caldwell-Union KY-Webster-Hopkins-Christian-Henderson- Daviess-McLean-Muhlenberg-Todd-Mississippi-New Madrid- Including the cities of Princeton, Owensboro, Metropolis, Madisonville, Bardwell, Hopkinsville, Wickliffe, Morganfield, Henderson, Hickman, Elizabethtown, Benton, Elkton, Marion, Clinton, Paducah, Greenville, Golconda, Smithland, Eddyville, Calhoun, New Madrid, Charleston, Cadiz, Dixon, Mayfield, Rockport, and Murray 1251 PM CST Fri Feb 14 2025

...FLOOD WATCH REMAINS IN EFFECT FROM MIDNIGHT CST TONIGHT THROUGH LATE SATURDAY NIGHT...

* WHAT...Significant and widespread Flash flooding caused by excessive rainfall continues to be possible. This is a particularly dangerous situation.

* WHERE...Alexander, Gallatin, Hamilton, Johnson, Pulaski, Saline, Union, White and Williamson Counties in Southern Illinois. All of western Kentucky, All of southwest Indiana, Butler, Mississippi, Ripley, Scott and Stoddard Counties in southeast Missouri.

* WHEN...From midnight CST tonight through late Saturday night.

* IMPACTS...Excessive runoff may result in flooding of rivers, creeks, streams, and other low-lying and flood-prone locations.

* ADDITIONAL DETAILS... - Widespread rainfall amounts of 3 to 5 inches are forecast. Localized areas of 6 inches or more are possible somewhere in the watch area. This would lead to significant and widespread flash flooding with impacts in locations not normally subject to flooding. - http://www.weather.gov/safety/flood

PRECAUTIONARY/PREPAREDNESS ACTIONS...

Those in the watch area should take precautions for flood conditions. Remove debris from storm drains and clear flood prone locations. You should monitor later forecasts and be prepared to take action should Flash Flood Warnings be issued.

&&

$$

ILZ082-083-085>089-092-093-INZ081-082-085>087-MOZ108>111-150600- /O.CON.KPAH.FA.A.0002.250215T0600Z-250216T1200Z/ /00000.0.ER.000000T0000Z.000000T0000Z.000000T0000Z.OO/ Hamilton-White-Williamson-Saline-Gallatin-Union-Johnson-Alexander- Pulaski-Gibson-Pike-Posey-Vanderburgh-Warrick-Ripley-Butler- Stoddard-Scott- Including the cities of McLeansboro, Boonville, Jonesboro, Fort Branch, Vienna, Sikeston, Mound City, Poseyville, Herrin, Petersburg, Doniphan, Evansville, Bloomfield, Carmi, Cairo, Poplar Bluff, Shawneetown, and Harrisburg 1251 PM CST Fri Feb 14 2025 /151 PM EST Fri Feb 14 2025/

...FLOOD WATCH REMAINS IN EFFECT FROM MIDNIGHT CST /1 AM EST/ TONIGHT THROUGH LATE SATURDAY NIGHT...

* WHAT...Significant and widespread flash flooding caused by excessive rainfall continues to be possible. This is a particularly dangerous situation.

* WHERE...Alexander, Gallatin, Hamilton, Johnson, Pulaski, Saline, Union, White and Williamson Counties in Southern Illinois. All of western Kentucky, All of southwest Indiana, Butler, Mississippi, Ripley, Scott and Stoddard Counties in southeast Missouri.

* WHEN...From midnight CST /1 AM EST/ tonight through late Saturday night.

* IMPACTS...Excessive runoff may result in flooding of rivers, creeks, streams, and other low-lying and flood-prone locations. Storm drains and ditches may become clogged with debris. Extensive street flooding and flooding of creeks and rivers are possible.

* ADDITIONAL DETAILS... - Widespread rainfall amounts of 3 to 5 inches are forecast. Localized areas of 6 inches or more are possible somewhere in the watch area. This would lead to significant and widespread flash flooding with impacts in locations not normally subject to flooding. - http://www.weather.gov/safety/flood

PRECAUTIONARY/PREPAREDNESS ACTIONS...

Those in the watch area should take precautions for flood conditions. Remove debris from storm drains and clear flood prone locations. You should monitor later forecasts and be prepared to take action should Flash Flood Warnings be issued.

&&

$$

JGG

=== PDS flood warning ===
PDS Flood Warnings are sometimes issued by local NWS offices when a long duration flood event causes significant flooding.

The PDS Flood Warning shown below was issued by the National Weather Service in Grand Junction on November 1, 2026.

Flood Warning

National Weather Service Grand Junction CO 408 PM MST Sun Nov 1 2026

.Significant and historic flooding is occurring across southwest Colorado and southeast Utah. Widespread rainfall will continue through Monday. Excessive runoff will also increase flooding risks. Many local roads have become flooded and impassable. Some roads have washed out, or collapsed completely. If you live in the warned area, it is recommended to not travel this evening or overnight. This is a PARTICULARLY DANGEROUS SITUATION.

COC007-033-067-083-113-UTC037-022315- /O.NEW.KGJT.FA.W.0029.261101T2308Z-261102T2315Z/ /00000.0.ER.000000T0000Z.000000T0000Z.000000T0000Z.OO/ Archuleta CO-Dolores CO-La Plata CO-Montezuma CO-San Miguel CO- San Juan UT- 408 PM MST Sun Nov 1 2026

...FLOOD WARNING IN EFFECT UNTIL 415 PM MST MONDAY...

- WHAT...Major flooding caused by excessive rainfall will continue.

This is a PARTICULARLY DANGEROUS SITUATION.

- WHERE...Western Archuleta County in southwestern Colorado...

Western Dolores County in southwestern Colorado... Southeastern La Plata County in southwestern Colorado... Montezuma County in southwestern Colorado... West Central San Miguel County in southwestern Colorado... Southern San Juan County in southeastern Utah...

- WHEN...Until 415 PM MST Monday.
- IMPACTS...Flooding of rivers, creeks, streams, and other low-lying

and flood-prone locations is occurring. Numerous roads remain closed due to flooding.

- ADDITIONAL DETAILS...

- At 359 PM MST, local law enforcement reported heavy rain in the warned area. Flooding is already occurring. Between 1.5 and 3 inches of rain have fallen. - Some locations that will experience flooding include... Durango, Blanding, Mexican Hat, Cortez, Pagosa Springs, Dolores, Dove Creek, Ignacio, Aneth, Montezuma Creek, White Mesa, Bluff, Tselakai Dezza, Halchita, Goulding, Hovenweep National Monument, Towaoc, Arriola, Yellow Jacket and Lewis. - http://www.weather.gov/safety/flood

PRECAUTIONARY/PREPAREDNESS ACTIONS...

Turn around, don`t drown when encountering flooded roads. Most flood deaths occur in vehicles.

Be especially cautious at night when it is harder to recognize the dangers of flooding.

&&

LAT...LON 3759 10904 3799 10890 3724 10826 3721 10831 3750 10779 3736 10784 3709 10743 3715 10744 3737 10735 3716 10712 3735 10692 3717 10686 3700 10707 3700 11091 3724 11065 3705 11055 3732 11021 3719 10996 3773 10967 3782 10928

$$

TGR

=== PDS river flood warning ===
PDS River Flood Warnings are sometimes issued by local NWS offices when a river is expected to hit, or has hit Major Flood Stage, and could pose a significant risk to life and property. There is no proof of the use of PDS River Flood Warnings in official NWS policy, so like many alerts, the use of PDS within them may be up to forecaster discretion and may not be universal across all NWS offices.

The PDS River Flood Warning shown below was issued by the National Weather Service in Grand Junction on October 31, 2026.

278

WGUS85 KGJT 312344 FLSGJT

Flood Statement National Weather Service Grand Junction CO 544 PM MDT Sat Oct 31 2026

...The Flood Warning continues for the following rivers in Colorado...

...This is a PARTICULARY DANGEROUS SITUATION...

For the San Juan River at Pagosa Springs affecting Archuleta County.

.Significant and historic flooding is possible along the San Juan River at Pagosa Springs. Widespread rainfall is expected to begin early Sunday morning and continue through Monday morning. Excessive runoff will also increase flooding risks. The region should prepare for a dangerous and impactful flood event.

For the San Juan River...including Pagosa Springs...major flooding is forecast. This is a particularly dangerous situation.

PRECAUTIONARY/PREPAREDNESS ACTIONS...

Turn around, don`t drown when encountering flooded roads. Most flood deaths occur in vehicles.

Be especially cautious at night when it is harder to recognize the dangers of flooding.

Heed any evacuation orders from local authorities.

Please report observed flooding to local emergency services or law enforcement.

Additional information is available at www.weather.gov/gjt.

The next statement will be issued Monday evening at 915 PM MST.

&&

COC007-030415- /O.EXT.KGJT.FL.W.0002.261102T0010Z-261103T0410Z/ /PSPC2.3.ER.000000T0000Z.000000T0000Z.000000T0000Z.NR/ 544 PM MDT Sat Oct 31 2026

...FLOOD WARNING REMAINS IN EFFECT FROM SUNDAY AFTERNOON TO MONDAY EVENING...

- WHAT...Major flooding caused by excessive rainfall is forecast

along the San Juan River. This is a Particularly Dangerous Situation.

- WHERE...San Juan River at Pagosa Springs.
- WHEN...From Sunday afternoon to Monday evening.
- IMPACTS...At 17.0 feet, Portions of San Juan Street are beginning

to flood. Waters have reached the foundation of the Colorado Ranger Building.

- ADDITIONAL DETAILS...

- At 5:00 PM MDT Saturday the stage was 6.6 feet. - Bankfull stage is 8.5 feet. - Forecast...The river is expected to rise above flood stage tomorrow afternoon to a crest of 17.0 feet early Monday morning. It will then fall below flood stage Monday afternoon. - Flood stage is 10.5 feet. - Flood History...This crest compares to a previous crest of 17.8 feet on 10/05/1911. - http://www.weather.gov/safety/flood

&&

LAT...LON 3738 10682 3723 10698 3715 10701 3715 10708 3738 10700

$$

TGR

=== PDS high wind warning ===
PDS high wind warnings are issued by the National Weather Service when non-convective winds are expected to be especially damaging or dangerous to people and property, beyond what would be expected of a typical high wind warning.

The warning below was issued by the National Weather Service in Salt Lake City, Utah, on September 8, 2020, for an extreme downslope wind event in Salt Lake City and the northern Wasatch Front.

URGENT - WEATHER MESSAGE

National Weather Service Salt Lake City UT 911 AM MDT Tue Sep 8 2020

UTZ002-003-082315- /O.CON.KSLC.HW.W.0006.000000T0000Z-200909T1500Z/ Northern Wasatch Front-Salt Lake and Tooele Valleys- Including the cities of Ogden, Bountiful, and Salt Lake City 911 AM MDT Tue Sep 8 2020

...HIGH WIND WARNING REMAINS IN EFFECT UNTIL 9 AM MDT WEDNESDAY...

...THIS IS A PARTICULARLY DANGEROUS SITUATION....

* WHAT...East winds 30 to 45 mph with gusts in excess of 70 mph are expected. Wind gusts as high as 98 mph near Farmington, Centerville and the mouth of Weber Canyon have been reported this morning. This is a particularly dangerous situation.

* WHERE...Salt Lake and Tooele Valleys and Northern Wasatch Front.

* WHEN...Until 9 AM MDT Wednesday.

* IMPACTS...High winds may move loose debris, damage property and cause power outages. Travel will be difficult especially for high profile vehicles. The most impacted travel routes are expected to be along the I-15 corridor between Salt Lake City and Layton, the Legacy Parkway, the US 89 corridor in Davis and Weber Counties, and Foothill Drive.

* ADDITIONAL DETAILS...Stay inside! Flying debris and numerous falling trees may be deadly.

PRECAUTIONARY/PREPAREDNESS ACTIONS...

People are urged to secure loose objects that could be blown around or damaged by the wind.

&&

$$

=== PDS red flag warning ===
PDS red flag warnings are issued by the National Weather Service to inform the public that there is an unusually high threat of wildland fire combustion, and rapid spread of wildfires, due to very dry fuels, very low humidity levels, and strong winds.

The PDS red flag warning below was issued by the National Weather Service in Reno, Nevada, on December 19, 2017.

On August 3, 2018, the National Weather Service in Reno, Nevada, issued another PDS red flag warning to communicate the threat of life-threatening fire danger due to strong gusty winds and low humidity.

On April 12, 2022, the National Weather Service in Norman, Oklahoma, issued a PDS red flag warning because of an extreme fire weather behavior (overlap of extremely dry fuels, humidity as low as 8 percent and wind gusting to 60 mph).

On January 7, 2025, during a destructive wildfire event affecting much of greater Los Angeles and surrounding areas, the National Weather Service in Los Angeles-Oxnard, California issued numerous PDS red flag warnings due to extreme winds and low humidity.

On June 25, 2026, the National Weather Service in Salt Lake City, Utah, issued a PDS red flag warning in southern and central Utah due to strong winds and the Cottonwood Fire that affected Eagle Point, Utah, and surrounding areas.

URGENT - FIRE WEATHER MESSAGE

National Weather Service Reno NV 140 PM PST Tue Dec 19 2017

CAZ273-201500- /O.CON.KREV.FW.W.0017.171220T0300Z-171221T0300Z/ Mono and Eastern Alpine Counties- 140 PM PST Tue Dec 19 2017

...RED FLAG WARNING REMAINS IN EFFECT FROM 7 PM THIS EVENING TO 7 PM PST WEDNESDAY FOR GUSTY WINDS AND LOW HUMIDITY FOR MONO COUNTY SOUTH OF MONO LAKE...

...THIS IS A PARTICULARLY DANGEROUS SITUATION...

AFFECTED AREA...Fire Zone 273 Mono and Eastern Alpine Counties.

Winds...Southwest 25 to 40 mph with gusts up to 70 mph late tonight into Wednesday morning. The winds will shift to the north by early Wednesday afternoon with speeds of 20 to 30 mph and gusts to 55 mph.

Location and timing of strongest wind gusts...The strongest wind gusts will be along the 395 corridor tonight into Wednesday morning. Wednesday afternoon the strongest gusts will be in the Owens and Chalfant Valleys.

Humidity...As low as 10 to 20% tonight and again late Wednesday afternoon. Brief recovery near or above 50% is possible late Wednesday morning.

Duration...10 to 15 hours, locally up to 20 hours.

Impacts...The combination of gusty winds and low humidity can cause fire to rapidly grow in size and intensity.

PRECAUTIONARY/PREPAREDNESS ACTIONS...

This is a particularly dangerous situation with low humidity and very high winds. New fires will grow rapidly out of control, in some cases people may not be able to evacuate safely in time should a fire approach. Avoid outdoor activities that can cause a spark near dry vegetation, such as yard work, target shooting, or campfires. Follow local fire restrictions. Check weather.gov/reno

for updates and livingwithfire.info for preparedness tips.

=== PDS severe thunderstorm watch ===
PDS severe thunderstorm watches are issued when there is a higher than normal risk of severe thunderstorm winds capable of major structural damage (in addition to large hail and perhaps a few isolated tornadoes), usually due to a strong and persistent derecho. These watches are very rare (accounting an average of only two each year), as the risk for tornadoes must remain low enough to not warrant a tornado watch (a normal tornado watch would be issued if the tornado risk is significant alongside the extreme wind threat).

This PDS severe thunderstorm watch shown below was issued by the Storm Prediction Center in Norman, Oklahoma, on May 12, 2022, for a derecho in portions of Iowa, Minnesota, Nebraska, and South Dakota.

SEL8

URGENT - IMMEDIATE BROADCAST REQUESTED Severe Thunderstorm Watch Number 208 NWS Storm Prediction Center Norman OK 325 PM CDT Thu May 12 2022

The NWS Storm Prediction Center has issued a

* Severe Thunderstorm Watch for portions of Northwest Iowa Southwest Minnesota Northeast Nebraska Southeast South Dakota

* Effective this Thursday afternoon and evening from 325 PM until 1000 PM CDT.

...THIS IS A PARTICULARLY DANGEROUS SITUATION...

* Primary threats include... Widespread damaging winds and scattered significant gusts to 105 mph expected Scattered large hail likely with isolated very large hail events to 2 inches in diameter possible A couple tornadoes possible

SUMMARY...A prolific wind-damage event is expected unfold from northeast Nebraska into southeast South Dakota and northwest Iowa/southwest Minnesota. Pockets of significant wind damage are highly likely, along with the potential for large hail and possible a line-embedded tornado or two.

The severe thunderstorm watch area is approximately along and 60 statute miles north and south of a line from 60 miles west of Mitchell SD to 5 miles east northeast of Spencer IA. For a complete depiction of the watch see the associated watch outline update (WOUS64 KWNS WOU8).

PRECAUTIONARY/PREPAREDNESS ACTIONS...

REMEMBER...A Severe Thunderstorm Watch means conditions are favorable for severe thunderstorms in and close to the watch area. Persons in these areas should be on the lookout for threatening weather conditions and listen for later statements and possible warnings. Severe thunderstorms can and occasionally do produce tornadoes.

&&

OTHER WATCH INFORMATION...CONTINUE...WW 205...WW 206...WW 207...

AVIATION...A few severe thunderstorms with hail surface and aloft to 2 inches. Extreme turbulence and surface wind gusts to 90 knots. A few cumulonimbi with maximum tops to 550. Mean storm motion vector 22045.

...Guyer

=== PDS special marine warning ===
PDS Special marine warnings are issued by the National Weather Service to inform mariners of weather conditions that present a considerable threat to life and property.

On April 19, 2018, the Baltimore/Washington, D.C. forecast office upgraded a special marine warning to PDS status as a gust front approached Chesapeake Bay.

National Weather Service Baltimore MD/Washington DC

1138 AM EDT THU APR 19 2018

ANZ537-191700- /O.CON.KLWX.MA.W.0020.000000T0000Z-180419T1700Z/ 1138 AM EDT THU APR 19 2018

...A SPECIAL MARINE WARNING REMAINS IN EFFECT UNTIL 100 PM EDT...

For the following areas... Tidal Potomac from Cobb Island MD to Smith Point VA...

At 1137 AM EDT, a gust front was located near Quantico Marine Base, moving southeast at 25 knots. Numerous wind gusts of 35 to 45 knots have been observed with this line.

HAZARD...Wind gusts 34 knots or greater.

SOURCE...Radar indicated.

IMPACT...Boaters in small craft could be thrown overboard by suddenly higher winds and waves capsizing their vessel.

Locations impacted include... Yeocomico River... Breton Bay... Point Lookout... Coltons Point... Saint Clements Bay... Coles Point... Mouth Of The Potomac River... Saint George Island... White Point Beach... Tall Timbers... and Piney Point.

PRECAUTIONARY/PREPAREDNESS ACTIONS...

This is a particularly dangerous situation. Sudden onset of gale force winds can cause even experienced mariners to capsize. Capsizing in cold water is especially dangerous and can quickly result in hypothermia. If you haven't already done so, move to safe harbor now!

&&

LAT...LON 3797 7641 3801 7647 3802 7651 3807 7654 3811 7660 3815 7661 3817 7676 3817 7685 3826 7686 3825 7684 3823 7660 3821 7657 3814 7652 3806 7633 3801 7629 3791 7627 TIME...MOT...LOC 1537Z 310DEG 27KT 3871 7777 3813 7848

HAIL...0.00in WIND...>34kts

$$

DHOF

=== PDS special weather statement ===
PDS special weather statements are usually issued by the NWS for hazards that do not have a specific code of their own and pose an exceptionally high risk of damage and loss of life.

The PDS special weather statement below was issued by the National Weather Service in Buffalo, New York, on December 11, 2013, regarding extreme amounts of lake effect snow to impact the defined area. The same office issued multiple PDS Special Weather Statements for hurricane-force winds forecast to hit the Buffalo area on February 24, 2019.

SPECIAL WEATHER STATEMENT

NATIONAL WEATHER SERVICE BUFFALO NY 255 PM EST WED DEC 11 2013

NYZ006>008-112200- OSWEGO-JEFFERSON-LEWIS- INCLUDING THE CITIES OF...OSWEGO...WATERTOWN...LOWVILLE 255 PM EST WED DEC 11 2013

...EXTREMELY HEAVY LAKE EFFECT SNOW TO CONTINUE THROUGH THE EVENING COMMUTE...

A BAND OF VERY INTENSE LAKE EFFECT SNOW EXTENDING FROM BETWEEN SANDY CREEK AND ADAMS ALONG I-81...EASTWARD TO LOWVILLE AND CROGHAN WILL CONTINUE THROUGH THE AFTERNOON. OTHER AREAS IMPACTED BY THIS SNOW BAND INCLUDE BUT ARE NOT LIMITED TO MONTAGUE...MARTINSBURG...HIGHMARKET...TURIN...SANDY CREEK...LACONA...PULASKI...LOWVILLE AND LYONS FALLS. THIS BAND WILL DRIFT SLIGHTLY NORTH OVER THE NEXT COUPLE OF HOURS. SNOWFALL RATES OF 3 TO 5 INCHES PER HOUR CAN BE EXPECTED WITHIN THE MOST INTENSE LAKE BANDS. IN ADDITION...WEST WINDS BETWEEN 15 TO 30 MPH WILL RESULT IN CONSIDERABLE BLOWING AND DRIFTING SNOW...REDUCING VISIBILITIES TO NEAR ZERO AT TIMES MAKING FOR WHITE OUT CONDITIONS.

...THIS IS A PARTICULARLY DANGEROUS SITUATION...

THIS WILL PRODUCE TREACHEROUS TRAVEL CONDITIONS ACROSS THE TUG HILL...INTERSTATE 81 FROM PULASKI TO ADAMS...AND ALONG STATE ROUTE 12 FROM TURIN TO LOWVILLE. TRAVEL ACROSS THESE AREAS WILL BE NEARLY IMPOSSIBLE THIS AFTERNOON...AND IS HIGHLY DISCOURAGED.

$$

JAM

=== PDS tornado watch ===
PDS tornado watches are issued when there is a significantly higher than normal risk of multiple EF2 or stronger tornadoes – especially those that are predicted to be long-track in nature, with path lengths of more than 20 miles – in the watch area (usually amounting to damage consistent with EF4 or EF5 tornadoes at maximum), in addition to including significant wind and hail damage. This enhanced wording in a Tornado Watch is meant to alert the public of the potential for very life-threatening severe weather. Under current criteria, such would be issued when the probability for significant tornadoes is 80% or greater. PDS Tornado Watches are often issued on high-risk days for severe weather, though they have been issued on high-end moderate risk days.

The PDS tornado watch shown below was issued on May 18, 2026.

SEL2

URGENT - IMMEDIATE BROADCAST REQUESTED Tornado Watch Number 222 NWS Storm Prediction Center Norman OK 1250 PM CDT Mon May 18 2026

The NWS Storm Prediction Center has issued a

* Tornado Watch for portions of Northeast Kansas Southeast Nebraska

* Effective this Monday afternoon and evening from 1250 PM until 800 PM CDT.

...THIS IS A PARTICULARLY DANGEROUS SITUATION...

* Primary threats include... Several tornadoes and a few intense tornadoes likely Scattered large hail and isolated very large hail events to 3 inches in diameter likely Scattered damaging wind gusts to 70 mph likely

SUMMARY...Rapid supercell development is expected over north-central Kansas. These storms will track northeastward through the afternoon across the watch area, into far southeast Nebraska. Instability and shear parameters suggest the potential for intense tornadoes, along with very large hail and damaging winds.

The tornado watch area is approximately along and 40 statute miles north and south of a line from 45 miles west of Salina KS to 10 miles east southeast of Falls City NE. For a complete depiction of the watch see the associated watch outline update (WOUS64 KWNS WOU2).

PRECAUTIONARY/PREPAREDNESS ACTIONS...

REMEMBER...A Tornado Watch means conditions are favorable for tornadoes and severe thunderstorms in and close to the watch area. Persons in these areas should be on the lookout for threatening weather conditions and listen for later statements and possible warnings.

&&

OTHER WATCH INFORMATION...CONTINUE...WW 220...WW 221...

AVIATION...Tornadoes and a few severe thunderstorms with hail surface and aloft to 3 inches. Extreme turbulence and surface wind gusts to 60 knots. A few cumulonimbi with maximum tops to 550. Mean storm motion vector 25030.

...Hart

=== PDS tornado warning ===
PDS tornado warnings are tornado warnings that use the considerable damage-threat category within the National Weather Service's impact-based warning framework. They are issued in rare situations when there is a considerable threat to life and property due to a strong, ongoing tornado. When this category is used, the warning includes the line "This is a PARTICULARLY DANGEROUS SITUATION. TAKE COVER NOW!" Within this framework, the higher catastrophic category is used for a tornado emergency, which is reserved for exceedingly rare situations involving a severe threat to human life and catastrophic damage. PDS tornado warnings are issued by local National Weather Service forecast offices.

Below is an example of a PDS Tornado Warning, issued for the 2025 Somerset–London tornado on May 16, 2025.

168

WFUS53 KJKL 170307 TORJKL KYC121-125-199-203-170400- /O.NEW.KJKL.TO.W.0026.250517T0307Z-250517T0400Z/

BULLETIN - EAS ACTIVATION REQUESTED Tornado Warning National Weather Service JACKSON KY 1107 PM EDT Fri May 16 2025

The National Weather Service in JACKSON KY has issued a

* Tornado Warning for... Laurel County in south central Kentucky... Northwestern Knox County in southeastern Kentucky... East central Pulaski County in south central Kentucky... South central Rockcastle County in south central Kentucky...

* Until midnight EDT.

* At 1107 PM EDT, a confirmed large and extremely dangerous tornado was located over Ruth, or near Somerset, moving east at 45 mph.

This is a PARTICULARLY DANGEROUS SITUATION. TAKE COVER NOW!

HAZARD...Damaging tornado.

SOURCE...Weather spotters confirmed tornado.

IMPACT...You are in a life-threatening situation. Flying debris may be deadly to those caught without shelter. Mobile homes will be destroyed. Considerable damage to homes, businesses, and vehicles is likely and complete destruction is possible.

* The tornado will be near... Mount Victory around 1115 PM EDT. Bunch around 1125 PM EDT.

Other locations in the path of this tornadic thunderstorm include London, Levi Jackson S.P. and Lesbas.

PRECAUTIONARY/PREPAREDNESS ACTIONS...

To repeat, a large, extremely dangerous and potentially deadly tornado is on the ground. To protect your life, TAKE COVER NOW! Move to a basement or an interior room on the lowest floor of a sturdy building. Avoid windows. If you are outdoors, in a mobile home, or in a vehicle, move to the closest substantial shelter and protect yourself from flying debris.

&&

LAT...LON 3715 8464 3724 8397 3718 8396 3717 8397 3715 8395 3697 8391 3699 8462 TIME...MOT...LOC 0307Z 264DEG 38KT 3707 8452

TORNADO...OBSERVED TORNADO DAMAGE THREAT...CONSIDERABLE MAX HAIL SIZE...2.00 IN

$$

VORST

=== PDS wind chill/extreme cold warning ===
PDS extreme cold warnings are issued when there is an enhanced risk of life-threatening frost bite and hypothermia due to extremely low wind chills. These warnings are issued by the National Weather Service Weather Forecast Offices rather than the Storm Prediction Center.

The PDS extreme cold warning (then known as a wind chill warning) shown below was issued by the National Weather Service in the Twin Cities on January 5, 2014.

629

WWUS43 KMPX 050957 WSWMPX

URGENT - WINTER WEATHER MESSAGE NATIONAL WEATHER SERVICE TWIN CITIES/CHANHASSEN MN 357 AM CST SUN JAN 5 2014

...HISTORIC AND LIFE-THREATENING COLD AIR HAS ARRIVED... ...THIS IS A PARTICULARLY DANGEROUS SITUATION...

THE COLDEST AIRMASS SINCE 1996 CONTINUES TO MOVE SOUTHEAST OUT OF CANADA AND INTO MINNESOTA AND WISCONSIN. WIND CHILL VALUES WILL RANGE BETWEEN 30 AND 45 BELOW TODAY AND CONTINUE TO FALL THROUGH MONDAY MORNING. AIR TEMPERATURES TONIGHT WILL DROP INTO THE 20S AND 30S BELOW ZERO. GUSTY WEST OR NORTHWEST WINDS COMBINED WITH THESE EXTREMELY COLD TEMPERATURES WILL PRODUCE WIND CHILLS OF 50 TO 65 BELOW ZERO LATE TONIGHT AND EARLY MONDAY.

WIND CHILLS COLDER THAN 50 BELOW CAN CAUSE EXPOSED FLESH TO FREEZE IN ONLY 5 MINUTES. A WIND CHILL WARNING IS IN EFFECT FOR CENTRAL AND SOUTHERN MINNESOTA AND WEST CENTRAL WISCONSIN THROUGH NOON TUESDAY.

THE GUSTY WINDS WILL ALSO BRING AREAS OF BLOWING SNOW TO MUCH OF THE AREA TODAY AND TONIGHT. WHERE GUSTS REACH 35 TO 45 MPH OVER WESTERN AND SOUTHERN MINNESOTA...VISIBILITIES MAY OCCASIONALLY BE REDUCED TO LESS THAN A HALF MILE IN NEAR BLIZZARD CONDITIONS. THIS WILL BRING AN ADDITIONAL LEVEL OF DANGER TO ANYONE STRANDED.

MNZ041-047-048-054>057-064-065-067-073>075-082>085-091>093-052115- /O.CON.KMPX.WC.W.0001.000000T0000Z-140107T1800Z/ DOUGLAS-STEVENS-POPE-LAC QUI PARLE-SWIFT-CHIPPEWA-KANDIYOHI- YELLOW MEDICINE-RENVILLE-SIBLEY-REDWOOD-BROWN-NICOLLET-WATONWAN- BLUE EARTH-WASECA-STEELE-MARTIN-FARIBAULT-FREEBORN- INCLUDING THE CITIES OF...ALEXANDRIA...MORRIS...GLENWOOD... MADISON...BENSON...MONTEVIDEO...WILLMAR...GRANITE FALLS... OLIVIA...GAYLORD...REDWOOD FALLS...NEW ULM...ST. PETER... ST. JAMES...MANKATO...WASECA...OWATONNA...FAIRMONT...BLUE EARTH... ALBERT LEA 357 AM CST SUN JAN 5 2014

...WIND CHILL WARNING REMAINS IN EFFECT UNTIL NOON CST TUESDAY...

A WIND CHILL WARNING REMAINS IN EFFECT UNTIL NOON CST TUESDAY.

* THIS IS A PARTICULARLY DANGEROUS SITUATION! * WIND CHILL VALUES: 35 TO 65 BELOW...WITH THE COLDEST READINGS TONIGHT AND MONDAY MORNING.

* IMPACTS: EXPOSED FLESH WILL FREEZE IN 10 MINUTES WITH WIND CHILLS OF 35 BELOW...AND IN 5 MINUTES WITH WIND CHILLS OF 50 BELOW OR COLDER.

* OTHER IMPACTS...WINDS GUSTING BETWEEN 35 AND 45 MPH THIS AFTERNOON AND TONIGHT WILL LEAD TO BLOWING SNOW WITH VISIBILITIES OCCASIONALLY DROPPING TO 1/2 MILE OR LESS IN NEAR BLIZZARD CONDITIONS. SHOULD YOUR VEHICLE BECOME STRANDED...YOUR LIFE WILL BE AT RISK. CONSIDER POSTPONING ALL TRAVEL.

PRECAUTIONARY/PREPAREDNESS ACTIONS...

A WIND CHILL WARNING MEANS THE COMBINATION OF VERY COLD AIR AND STRONG WINDS WILL CREATE DANGEROUSLY LOW WIND CHILL VALUES. THIS WILL RESULT IN FROST BITE AND LEAD TO HYPOTHERMIA OR DEATH IF PRECAUTIONS ARE NOT TAKEN.

&&

$$

MNZ042>045-049>053-058>063-066-068>070-076>078-WIZ014>016-023>028- 052115 /O.CON.KMPX.WC.W.0001.000000T0000Z-140107T1800Z/ TODD-MORRISON-MILLE LACS-KANABEC-STEARNS-BENTON-SHERBURNE-ISANTI- CHISAGO-MEEKER-WRIGHT-HENNEPIN-ANOKA-RAMSEY-WASHINGTON-MCLEOD- CARVER-SCOTT-DAKOTA-LE SUEUR-RICE-GOODHUE-POLK-BARRON RUSK- ST. CROIX-PIERCE-DUNN-PEPIN-CHIPPEWA-EAU CLAIRE- INCLUDING THE CITIES OF...LONG PRAIRIE...LITTLE FALLS... PRINCETON...MORA...ST. CLOUD...FOLEY...ELK RIVER...CAMBRIDGE... CENTER CITY...LITCHFIELD...MONTICELLO...MINNEAPOLIS...BLAINE... ST. PAUL...STILLWATER...HUTCHINSON...CHASKA...SHAKOPEE... BURNSVILLE...LE SUEUR...FARIBAULT...RED WING...AMERY... BALSAM LAKE...RICE LAKE...BARRON...LADYSMITH...HUDSON... NEW RICHMOND...RIVER FALLS...PRESCOTT...MENOMONIE...BOYCEVILLE... DURAND...PEPIN...CHIPPEWA FALLS...BLOOMER...EAU CLAIRE...ALTOONA

357 AM CST SUN JAN 5 2014

...WIND CHILL WARNING REMAINS IN EFFECT UNTIL NOON CST TUESDAY...

A WIND CHILL WARNING REMAINS IN EFFECT UNTIL NOON CST TUESDAY.

* THIS IS A PARTICULARLY DANGEROUS SITUATION! * WIND CHILL VALUES: 35 TO 65 BELOW...WITH THE COLDEST READINGS TONIGHT AND MONDAY MORNING.

* IMPACTS: EXPOSED FLESH WILL FREEZE IN 10 MINUTES WITH WIND CHILLS OF 35 BELOW...AND IN 5 MINUTES WITH WIND CHILLS OF 50 BELOW OR COLDER.

* OTHER IMPACTS...AREAS OF BLOWING SNOW ARE POSSIBLE AS WINDS GUST AS HIGH AS 35 MPH THIS AFTERNOON AND TONIGHT.

PRECAUTIONARY/PREPAREDNESS ACTIONS...

A WIND CHILL WARNING MEANS THE COMBINATION OF VERY COLD AIR AND STRONG WINDS WILL CREATE DANGEROUSLY LOW WIND CHILL VALUES. THIS WILL RESULT IN FROST BITE AND LEAD TO HYPOTHERMIA OR DEATH IF PRECAUTIONS ARE NOT TAKEN.

&&

$$

BORGHOFF

=== PDS Dust Storm Warning ===
PDS Dust Storm Warnings are issued when a dust storm is capable of making travel extremely dangerous and life threatening and accidents more deadly.

The following below is an example of a PDS Dust Storm Warning issued by the National Weather Service in Reno, Nevada issued on May 17, 2025, at 12:02 PM PDT.

The National Weather Service in Reno has issued a
- Dust Storm Warning for...

West central Churchill County in west central Nevada... Storey County in western Nevada... Southern Washoe County in western Nevada... North central Lyon County in west central Nevada...

- Until 100 PM PDT.
- At 1200 PM PDT, a dust channel was over Hazen, or 7 miles north of

Lahontan Reservoir, moving south at 15 mph.

HAZARD...Less than a quarter mile visibility with strong wind in excess of 40 mph.

SOURCE...Doppler radar.

IMPACT...Dangerous life-threatening travel.

Interstate 80 from Derby Dam to Toulon. US-50 from Stagecoach to Hazen. Alt US-50 from Fernley to Fallon. US-95 from 5 miles south of Trinity Junction to Fallon.

Locations impacted include... Fernley - Tiger Field Airport, Fallon Municipal Airport, Fernley, Wadsworth, Us 50 At Lyon-Churchill Co Line, Silver Springs, Fallon, Silver Springs Airport, Fernley Sink Near I-80, Junction U.S 50 And NV 117 (sheckler Cutoff), Lahontan Reservoir, and Hazen.

PRECAUTIONARY/PREPAREDNESS ACTIONS...

DUST STORMS ARE DEADLY. Zero visibility. If caught in dust, pull off the road and turn off all lights. Delay travel if at all possible.

...THIS IS A PARTICULARLY DANGEROUS SITUATION! DELAY TRAVEL! Dust storms result in massive and deadly accidents.

=== Other watches and warnings ===
While the use of PDS wording for other types of watches and warnings has not been used, PDS wording could theoretically be applied to any kind of watch or warning to alert the public to weather events where there exists an increased risk of loss of life or widespread damage to property. Such situations could include PDS watches or warnings for blizzards, ice storms, or extreme heat. On June 8, 2026, the National Weather Service announced in a Service Change Notice that PDS wording will be used from October 1, 2026 for Blizzard and Ice Storm Warnings.
