= Larry Wilson =

Larry Wilson may refer to:

- Larry Wilson (American football) (1938–2020), American football player
- Larry Wilson (basketball), American basketball player
- Larry Wilson (ice hockey) (1930–1979), Canadian ice hockey player
- Larry Wilson (meteorologist) (born 1937), American meteorologist
- Larry Wilson (musician), member of the American band Biota
- Larry Wilson (screenwriter) (born 1948), American screenwriter
- Larry David Wilson (1940–2024), American herpetologist
- Larry Jon Wilson (1940–2010), American country singer, guitarist and musician
- Larry Y. Wilson (born 1949), American church authority

== See also ==
- Lawrence Wilson (disambiguation)
