= Lawrence Wilson (disambiguation) =

Lawrence Wilson (born 1987) is an American football player.

Lawrence Wilson or Laurence Wilson may also refer to:

- Lawrence Elery Wilson (1884–1946), American businessman and politician
- Lawrence Alexander Wilson (1863–1934), Canadian politician and philanthropist
- Laurence Wilson (born 1986), English footballer

== See also ==
- Lawrie Wilson, English footballer
- Larry Wilson (disambiguation)
