= 1948 Tinker Air Force Base tornadoes =

1948 windstorms in Oklahoma City, Oklahoma, USA

Tinker Air Force Base tornadoes
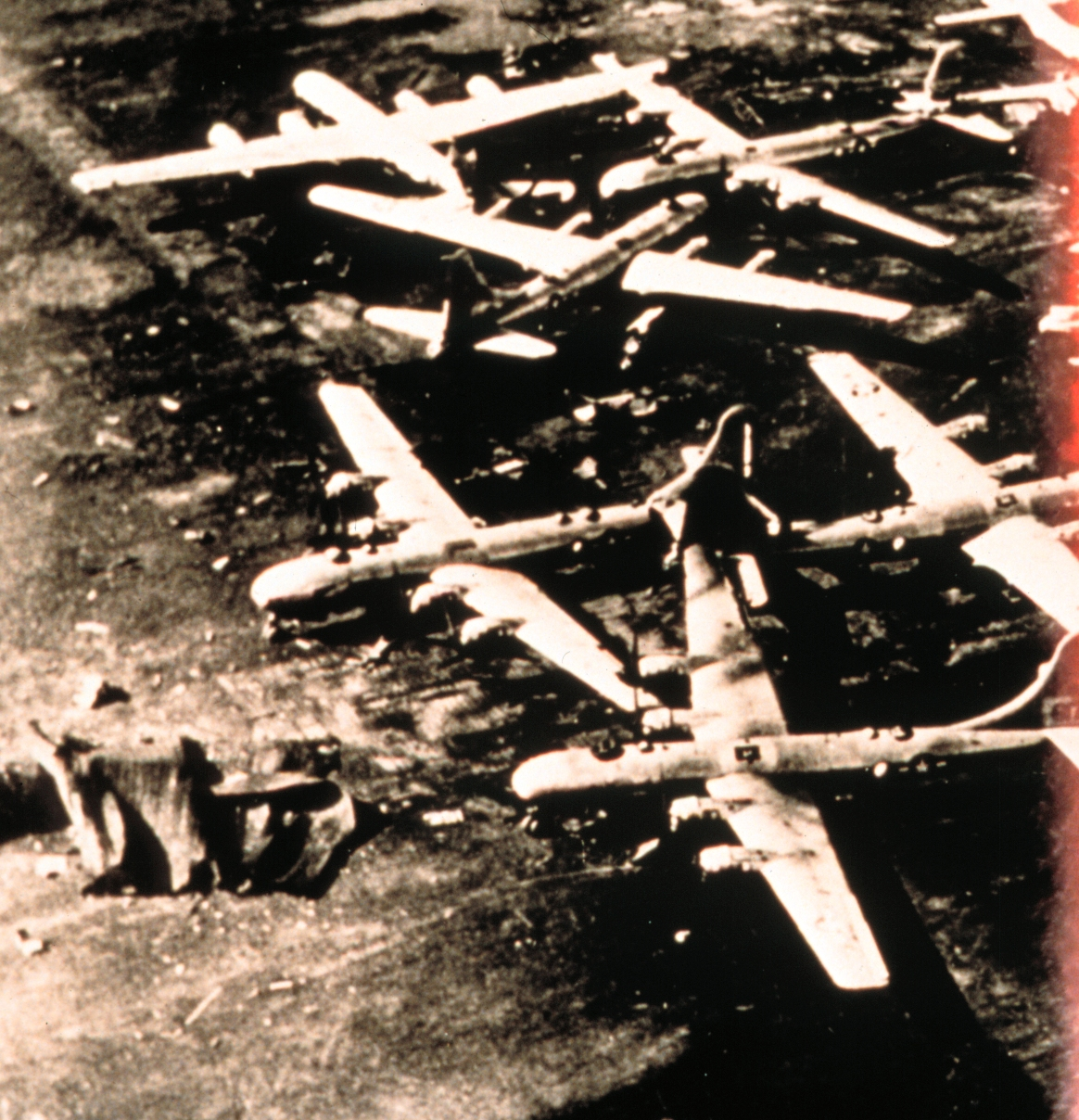
- Damage to United States Air Force B29 bombers from the March 20, 1948, tornado

Meteorological history
- Date: March 20 and 25, 1948

Tornado outbreak
- Tornadoes: 2
- Max. rating: F3 tornado

Overall effects
- Injuries: Several
- Damage: $16 million (1948) ($214 million 2025)
- Areas affected: Oklahoma City, Oklahoma

The 1948 Tinker Air Force Base tornadoes were two tornadoes which struck Tinker Air Force Base in Oklahoma City, Oklahoma, on March 20 and 25, 1948. Both are estimated to have been equivalent to F3 in intensity on the modern Fujita scale of tornado intensity, which was not devised until 1971. The March 20 tornado was the costliest in Oklahoma history at the time. On March 25, meteorologists at the base noticed the extreme similarity between the weather conditions of that day and March 20, and later in the day issued a "tornado forecast", which was verified when a tornado struck the base that evening. This was the first official tornado forecast, as well as the first successful tornado forecast, in recorded history.

== March 20 tornado ==
1st Tinker Air Base tornado
F3 tornado
- on the Fujita scale

Overall effects
- Injuries: Several
- Damage: $10 million (1948 USD)

Weather forecasting was still crude and prone to large errors in the era before weather satellites and computer modeling. Thunderstorms were not even in the forecast for the evening of March 20. However, around 9:30 pm, storms were reported about 20 miles (32 km) to the southwest, and at 9:52, a tornado was sighted near Will Rogers Airport 7 miles (11 km) away, along with a 92-mile-per-hour (148 km/h) wind gust, moving northeast towards the base.

At 10:00, the tornado reached the southwest corner of the base. Illuminated by nearly constant lightning, the tornado was highly visible as it bisected the base, tossing around planes which were parked in the open. The control tower reported a 78-mile-per-hour (126 km/h) wind gust before the windows shattered, injuring several personnel with flying glass. The tornado dissipated at the northeast corner of the base.

The tornado missed most structures on the base, but the damage to expensive military aircraft was substantial. The total damage cost came to around $10 million, or $134 million in 2025 United States dollars. At the time, it was the most damaging tornado recorded in Oklahoma.

Tornado expert Thomas P. Grazulis stated in June 2025 that the tornado was "near F5" intensity.

== Investigation and tornado forecast ==
In the aftermath of the first tornado, an official inquiry was conducted into the failure to predict the destructive tornado. Air Force investigators concluded that "due to the nature of the storm, it was not forecastable given the present state of the art." They also made recommendations that the meteorological community determine a tornado warning system for the public, as well as a protocol for protecting life and property at military bases.

Both of these investigations began almost immediately. In the days following the tornado, Tinker's meteorologists Major Ernest J. Fawbush and Captain Robert C. Miller investigated surface and upper-air weather data from this and past tornado outbreaks, hoping to be able to identify conditions which were favorable for tornadoes. By March 24, they had compiled several possible tornado indicators and decided it would be difficult, but possible, to identify large tornado threat areas in the future, based on the work of Albert K. Showalter and J. R. Fulks.

On the morning of March 25, base meteorologists noticed that weather charts for the day were strikingly similar to those before the March 20 tornado. Forecasts issued by the Weather Bureau indicated that almost the same conditions would be present in the evening of March 25 as were present on March 20. In the morning, they issued a forecast for "heavy thunderstorms" effective for 5–6 pm that evening. This would allow the base's commander to alert base personnel that they may institute their brand-new tornado precautions.

As the day progressed, conditions increasingly favored thunderstorms and began to closely resemble those of March 20. Weather radar images showed a severe squall line had formed to the west, and weather stations to the west reported cumulonimbus clouds and thunderstorms. In an afternoon meeting, under some pressure from their commanding officer, base meteorologists composed and issued the first official tornado forecast. Although they were aware of the small chance of success, they felt they had no choice, since the conditions were so similar to March 20. Equipment, which could be, was moved to bomb-proof shelters, and base personnel were moved to safer areas.

== March 25 tornado ==
2nd Tinker Air Force Base tornado
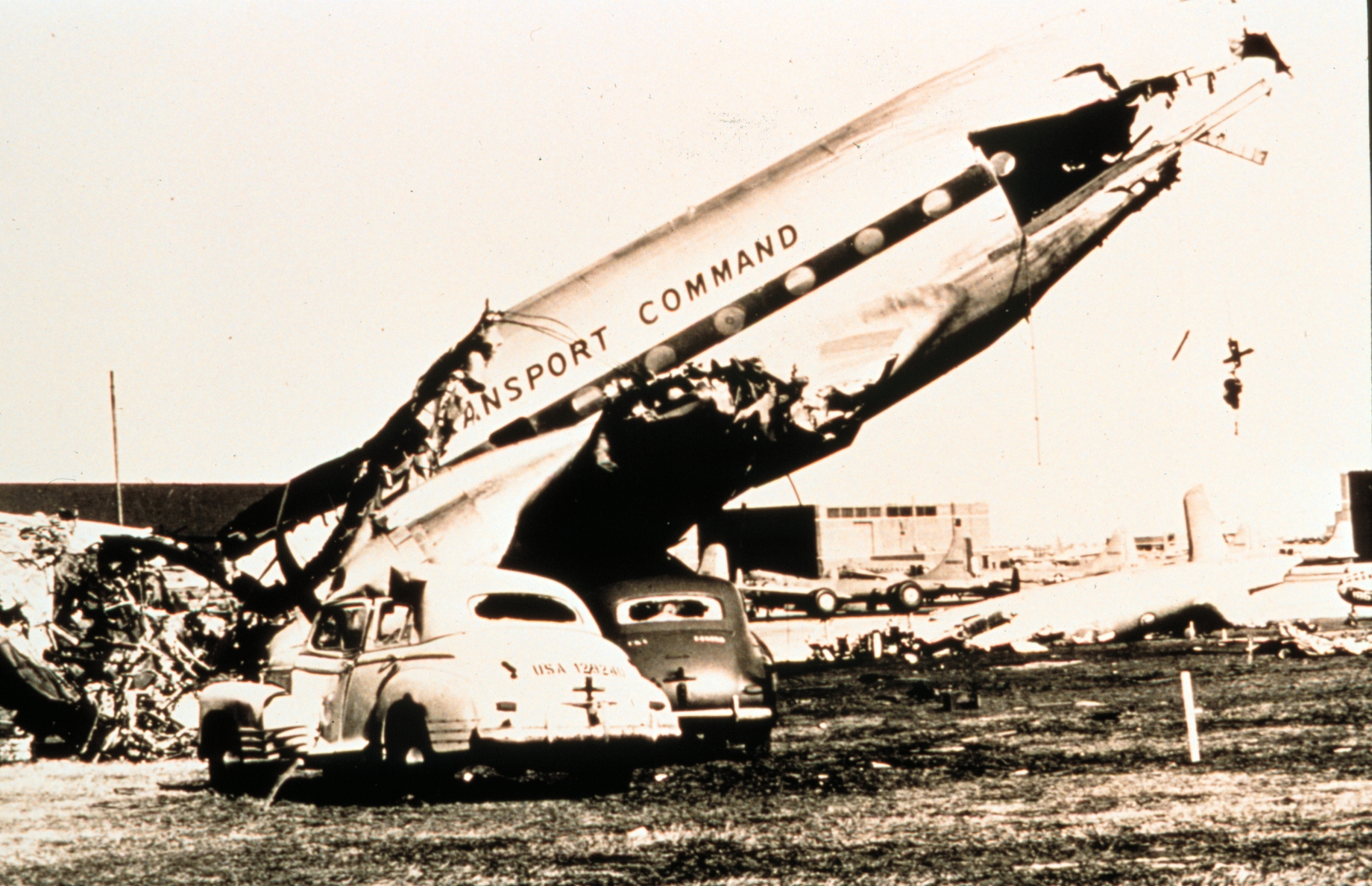
- Damage to airplanes and cars from the March 25 tornado

F3 tornado
- on the Fujita scale

Overall effects
- Damage: $6 million (1948 USD)

Although the storms were relatively benign up to the point where they reached Tinker, a supercell formed just west of the base, and at around 6 pm, a tornado touched down on the base for the second time in six days. This second tornado caused $6 million in damage, or $80 million in 2025 dollars. However, due to precautions enacted because of the tornado forecast, no injuries were reported, and damage totals could have been much higher.

== Legacy ==
The tornado prediction proved to be successful, even if its precision was mostly due to chance. Before this point, the Weather Bureau had a policy against issuing tornado warnings, mainly due to fear of panic by the public, and subsequent complacency if forecasts turned out to be false alarms.

Due to lives and costs saved, Fawbush and Miller continued their tornado forecasts, which were verified at quite a high rate over the next three years. At first, they kept their forecasts secret. In the spring and summer of 1949, they issued eighteen forecasts for tornadoes within a 100-square-mile (260 km^{2}) area, and all eighteen proved successful. In the subsequent years, while not explicitly using the word "tornado", the Weather Bureau used the pair's forecasts to predict "severe local storms".

The synoptic pattern which occurred on March 25 later became known as the "Miller type-B" pattern and is recognized as one of the most potent severe weather setups.

== See also ==
- Weather forecasting
- 1999 Bridge Creek–Moore tornado, another tornado that affected the airbase
