= Upper-atmospheric models =

Upper-atmospheric models are simulations of the Earth's atmosphere between 20 and 100 km (65,000 and 328,000 feet) that comprises the stratosphere, mesosphere, and the lower thermosphere. Whereas most climate models simulate a region of the Earth's atmosphere from the surface to the stratopause, there also exist numerical models which simulate the wind, temperature and composition of the Earth's tenuous upper atmosphere, from the mesosphere to the exosphere, including the ionosphere. This region is affected strongly by the 11 year Solar cycle through variations in solar UV/EUV/Xray radiation and solar wind leading to high latitude particle precipitation and aurora. It has been proposed that these phenomena may have an effect on the lower atmosphere, and should therefore be included in simulations of climate change. For this reason there has been a drive in recent years to create whole atmosphere models to investigate whether or not this is the case.

== Jet stream perturbation model ==
A jet stream perturbation model is employed by Weather Logistics UK, which simulates the diversion of the air streams in the upper atmosphere. North Atlantic air flow modelling is simulated by combining a monthly jet stream climatology input calculated at 20 to 30°W, with different blocking high patterns. The jet stream input is generated by thermal wind balance calculations at 316mbars (6 to 9 km aloft) in the mid-latitude range from 40 to 60°N. Long term blocking patterns are determined by the weather forecaster, who identifies the likely position and strength of North Atlantic Highs from synoptic charts, the North Atlantic Oscillation (NAO) and El Niño-Southern Oscillation (ENSO) patterns. The model is based on the knowledge that low pressure systems at the surface are steered by the fast ribbons (jet streams) of air in the upper atmosphere. The jet stream - blocking interaction model simulation examines the sea surface temperature field using data from NOAA tracked along the ocean on a path to the British Isles. The principal theory suggests that long term weather patterns act on longer time scales, so large blocking patterns are thought to appear in a similar locations repeatedly over several months. With a good knowledge of blocking high patterns, the model performs with an impressive accuracy that is useful to the end user.

== Probabilistic forecasting ==
The modelling undertaken at Weather Logistics UK produces regional-seasonal predictions that are probabilistic in nature. Two different blocking sizes are used for the modelling, located at two different locations. The four possible blocking diversions are then ranked in an order, to be combined by logistic regression and generate the appropriate likelihoods of weather events on seasonal time-scales. The raw output consists of 22 different weather conditions for each season that are compared to the average atmospheric conditions. A global warming bias and 1961–1990 climatology of regional British Isles temperatures are added to the anomaly value to produce a final temperature prediction. The seasonal weather forecasts at Weather Logistics UK include several additional weather components (derivatives) including: precipitation anomalies, storm tracks, air flow trajectories, heating degree days for household utility bills, cooling degree days, heat wave and the snow day odds.

== Planetary waves ==
According to a report in New Scientist many researchers are in consensus that Rossby waves are acting against the jet stream's usual pattern and holding it in place. Upper atmospheric studies using National Oceanic and Atmospheric Administration (NOAA) data indicates that during July 2010 these upper air stream patterns were most frequently observed in the Northern Hemisphere. Examination of the climatology data over the same period of time indicates that these wild planetary wave meanderings are not a normal aspect of our regional climate patterns. Meanwhile, ongoing research studies at the University of Reading show that unusual patterns in the polar jet stream are more common during a period of low activity in the solar cycle when the observed sunspot activity and their associated solar flares are at their minimum. The link between low solar activity and enhanced blocking patterns is associated with an increase in the prevalence of cold weather patterns during the European Winter. Another possible explanation for the observed increase in blocking patterns is natural variability, through the chaotic character of the large-scale ocean currents that flow across the surface of the tropical Pacific.

== See also ==
- Ionospheric model
