= Storm Prediction Center =

American severe weather forecasting center

Coordinates: 35°10′53″N 97°26′25″W

- The logo of the Storm Prediction Center.

Agency overview
- Formed: October 1995
- Preceding agencies: National Severe Storms Forecast Center (1966–1995); SELS (1953–1966)
- Jurisdiction: Federal government of the United States
- Headquarters: Norman, Oklahoma
- Employees: 43
- Agency executive: Russell Schneider, Director
- Parent agency: National Centers for Environmental Prediction
- Website: www.spc.noaa.gov

The Storm Prediction Center (SPC) is a US government agency that is part of the National Centers for Environmental Prediction (NCEP), operating under the control of the National Weather Service (NWS), which in turn is part of the National Oceanic and Atmospheric Administration (NOAA) of the United States Department of Commerce (DoC).

Headquartered at the National Weather Center in Norman, Oklahoma, the Storm Prediction Center is tasked with forecasting the risk of severe thunderstorms and tornadoes in the contiguous United States. It issues convective outlooks, mesoscale discussions, and watches as a part of this process. Convective outlooks are issued for the following eight days (issued separately for Day 1, Day 2, Day 3, and Days 4–8), and detail the risk of severe thunderstorms and tornadoes during the given forecast period, although tornado, hail and wind details are only available for Days 1 and 2. Day 3 uses a probabilistic scale from a Marginal to Moderate risk (A Day 3 High risk cannot be issued), while Days 4–8 use a probabilistic scale determining the probability for a severe weather event in percentage categories (15%/yellow and 30%/orange).

Mesoscale discussions are issued to provide information on certain individual regions where severe weather is becoming a threat and states whether a watch is likely and details thereof, particularly concerning conditions conducive for the development of severe thunderstorms in the short term, as well as situations of isolated severe weather when watches are not necessary. Watches are issued when atmospheric conditions favor the development of severe weather. Once a storm/tornado is imminent or occurring (such as via weather spotters, radar, river gages, etc), a warning will be issued, and it usually precedes the onset of severe weather by one hour, although this sometimes varies depending on certain atmospheric conditions that may inhibit or accelerate convective development.

The agency is also responsible for forecasting fire weather (indicating conditions that are favorable for wildfires) in the contiguous U.S., issuing fire weather outlooks for Days 1, 2, and 3–8, which detail areas with various levels of risk for fire conditions (such as fire levels and fire alerts).

== History ==
The Storm Prediction Center began in 1952 as SELS (Severe Local Storms Unit), as part of the U.S. Weather Bureau in Washington, D.C. In 1954, the unit moved its forecast operations to Kansas City, Missouri. SELS began issuing convective outlooks for predicted thunderstorm activity in 1955, and began issuing radar summaries in three-hour intervals in 1960; with the increased duties of compiling and disseminating radar summaries, this unit became the National Severe Storms Forecast Center (NSSFC) in 1966, remaining headquartered in Kansas City.

In 1968, the National Severe Storms Forecast Center began issuing status reports on weather watches; the agency then made its first computerized data transmission in 1971. On April 2, 1982, the agency issued its first "Particularly Dangerous Situation" watch, which indicates the imminent threat of a major severe weather event over the watch's timespan. In 1986, the NSSFC introduced two new forecast products: the Day 2 Convective Outlook (which included outlined areas having a risk for severe thunderstorms the following day) and the Mesoscale Discussion (a short-term forecast outlining specific areas under threat for more imminent severe thunderstorm development).

The National Severe Storms Forecast Center was renamed the Storm Prediction Center in October 1995, upon the creation of the NOAA-NWS National Centers for Environmental Prediction (NCEP), of which it was a part. In January 1997, the Storm Prediction Center completed a relocation to Norman, Oklahoma. At that time, the center was located near the Max Westheimer Airport (now the University of Oklahoma Westheimer Airport), on the "North Base" property of the University of Oklahoma, sharing space with the National Severe Storms Laboratory. (This building was across from the local National Weather Service Weather Forecast Office which, in addition to disseminating forecasts, oversees the issuance of weather warnings and advisories for the western two-thirds of Oklahoma and western portions of North Texas, and issues outline and status updates for SPC-issued severe thunderstorm and tornado watches that include areas served by the Norman office). In 1998, the Storm Prediction Center began issuing the National Fire Weather Outlook to provide forecasts for areas potentially susceptible to the development and spread of wildfires based on certain meteorological factors. The Day 3 Convective Outlook (which is similar in format to the Day 2 forecast) was first issued on an experimental basis in 2000, and became a routine product in 2001.

In 2006, the Storm Prediction Center, National Severe Storms Laboratory and National Weather Service Norman Forecast Office moved their respective operations into the newly constructed National Weather Center, on the south edge of the University of Oklahoma Norman campus. Since the agency's relocation to Norman, the 557th Weather Wing at Offutt Air Force Base would assume control of issuing the Storm Prediction Center's severe weather products in the event that the SPC is no longer able to issue them in the event of an outage (such as a computer system failure or building-wide power disruption) or emergency (such as an approaching strong tornadic circulation or tornado on the ground) affecting the Norman campus; on April 1, 2009, the SPC reassigned responsibilities for issuing the center's products in such situations to the 15th Operational Weather Squadron based out of Scott Air Force Base.

On March 17, 2025, ABC News, reporting from the word of an anonymous NOAA spokesperson, stated the Storm Prediction Center was set to be closed by the Department of Government Efficiency (DOGE), a branch of the U.S. government created by President Donald Trump to eliminate government waste. DOGE had announced other NOAA office terminations during March 2025. ABC News also reported the SPC office was listed on DOGE's website, however, as of March 18, DOGE's website says its most recent update was on March 11.

=== Brief history timeline ===
- 1948: Following Weather Bureau (WB) researchers' work by on a 20 March tornado at Tinker AFB, two officers (Fawbush and Miller) successfully predict another one five days later on 25 March at same base, given responsibility for AF tornado predictions.
- 1951: Severe Weather Warning Center (SWWC) established as an Air Weather Service unit, headed by Fawbush and Miller.
- 1952: WB establishes its own Weather Bureau-Army-Navy (WBAN) Analysis Center in Washington in March as a trial unit, made permanent on 21 May as the Weather Bureau Severe Weather Unit (SWU).
- 1953: SWU renamed Severe Local Storm (SELS) Warning Center on 17 June.
- 1954: SELS relocates from the WBAN Center in Washington to the WB's District Forecast Office (DFO) in downtown Kansas City in September.
- 1955: National Severe Storms Project (NSSP) formed SELS' as research component.
- 1958: SELS assumes authority for all public severe weather forecasts.
- 1962: Some from NSSP move to Norman's Weather Radar Laboratory to work with a new Weather Surveillance Radar-1957 (WSR-57).
- 1964: Remainder of NSSP moves to Norman and is reorganized as National Severe Storms Laboratory (NSSL).
- 1965: Environmental Science Services Administration (ESSA) formed, and entire WB office (SELS and DFO) in Kansas City renamed National Severe Storms Forecast Center (NSSFC).
- 1976: Techniques Development Unit (TDU) established in April to provide software development and evaluate forecast methods.
- 1995: NSSFC renamed Storm Prediction Center (SPC) in October.
- 1997: SPC moves from Kansas City to Norman.
- 2006: SPC moves a few miles south to the National Weather Center (NWC) on the University of Oklahoma Research Campus.
- 2023: On February 15, 2023, Meteorologist Elizabeth Leitman becomes the first woman at the SPC to issue a convective weather watch.

== Overview ==
The Storm Prediction Center is responsible for forecasting the risk of severe weather caused by severe thunderstorms, specifically those producing tornadoes, hail of one inch (2.5 cm) in diameter or larger, and/or winds of 58 miles per hour (93 km/h) [50 knots] or greater. The agency also forecasts hazardous winter and fire weather conditions. It does so primarily by issuing convective outlooks, severe thunderstorm watches, tornado watches and mesoscale discussions.

There is a three-stage process in which the area, time period, and details of a severe weather forecast are refined from a broad-scale forecast of potential hazards to a more specific and detailed forecast of what hazards are expected, and where and in what time frame they are expected to occur. If warranted, forecasts will also increase in severity through this three-stage process.

The Storm Prediction Center employs a total of 43 personnel, including five lead forecasters, ten mesoscale/outlook forecasters, and seven assistant mesoscale forecasters. Many SPC forecasters and support staff are heavily involved in scientific research into severe and hazardous weather. This involves conducting applied research and writing technical papers, developing training materials, giving seminars and other presentations locally and nationwide, attending scientific conferences, and participating in weather experiments.

== Convective outlooks ==
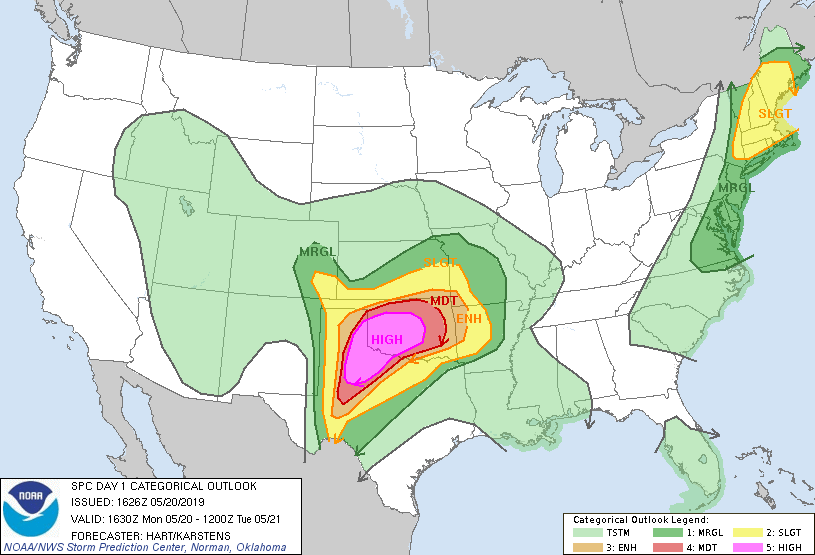
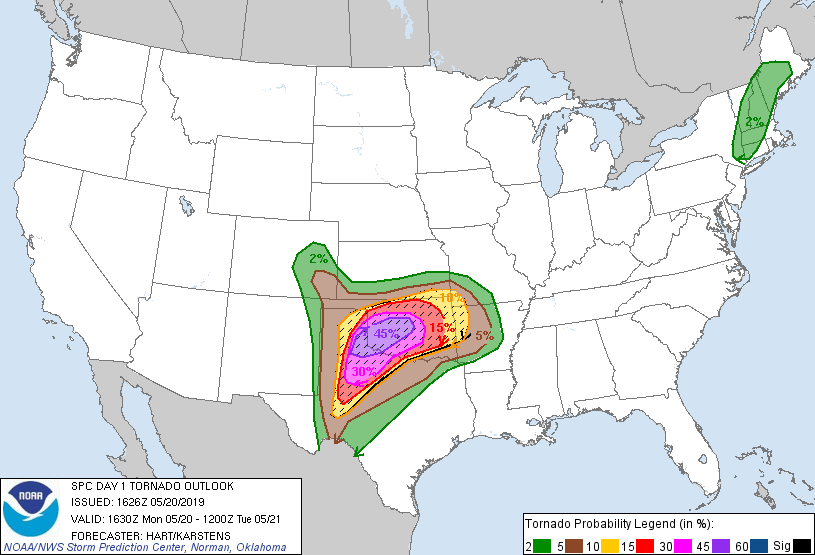
Day 1 Convective Outlook and probabilistic maps issued by the Storm Prediction Center on May 20, 2019 depicting a high risk day. The top map indicates the risk of general severe weather (including large hail, damaging winds, and tornadoes), while the bottom map specifically shows the risk percentage of a tornado forming within 25 miles (40 km) of any point within the enclosed area. The hatched area on the bottom map indicates a 10% or greater risk of an EF2 or stronger tornado forming within 25 miles (40 km) of a point.

The Storm Prediction Center issues convective outlooks (AC), consisting of categorical and probabilistic forecasts describing the general threat of severe convective storms over the contiguous United States for the next six to 192 hours (Day 1 through Day 8). These outlooks are labeled and issued by day, and are issued up to five times per day.

The categorical levels of risks are TSTM (for Thunder Storm: light green shaded area – rendered as a brown line prior to April 2011 – indicating a risk for general thunderstorms), "MRGL" (for Marginal: darker green shaded area, indicating a very low but present risk of severe weather); "SLGT" (for Slight: yellow shaded area – previously rendered as a green line – indicating a slight risk of severe weather); "ENH" (for Enhanced: orange shaded area, which replaced the upper end of the SLGT category on October 22, 2014); "MDT" (for Moderate: red shaded area – previously rendered as a red line – indicating a moderate risk of severe weather); and "HIGH" (pink shaded area – previously a rendered as a fuchsia line – indicating a high risk of severe weather).

In April 2011, the SPC introduced a new graphical format for its categorical and probability outlooks, which included the shading of risk areas (with the colors corresponding to each category, as mentioned above, being changed as well) and population, county/parish/borough and interstate overlays. The new shaded maps also incorporated a revised color palette for the shaded probability categories in each outlook.

In 2013, the SPC incorporated a small table under the Convective Outlook's risk category map that indicates the total coverage area by square miles, the total estimated population affected and major cities included within a severe weather risk area.

Public severe weather outlooks (PWO) are issued when a significant or widespread outbreak is expected, especially for tornadoes. From November to March, it can also be issued for any threat of significant tornadoes in the nighttime hours, noting the lower awareness and greater danger of tornadoes at that time of year.

=== Operational risk levels ===
An example of an Enhanced Risk day overlaid with the radar with Severe Thunderstorm Watches in effect

A marginal risk day indicates storms of only limited organization, longevity, coverage and/or intensity, typically isolated severe or near-severe storms with limited wind damage, large hail and possibly a low tornado risk. Wind gusts of at least 60 miles per hour (97 km/h) and hailstones of around 1 inch (2.5 cm) in diameter are common storm threats within a marginal risk; depending on the sufficient wind shear, a tornado – usually of weak (EF0 to EF1) intensity and short duration – may be possible. This category replaced the "SEE TEXT" category on October 22, 2014.

A slight risk day typically will indicate that the threat exists for scattered severe weather, including scattered wind damage (produced by straight-line sustained winds and/or gusts of 60 to 70 mph), scattered severe hail (varying in size from 0.25 inches (0.64 cm) to 1.75 inches (4.4 cm)) and/or isolated tornadoes (often of shorter duration and varying weak to moderate intensity, depending on the available wind shear and other sufficient atmospheric parameters). During the peak severe weather season, most days will have a slight risk somewhere in the United States. Isolated significant severe events are possible in some circumstances, but are generally not widespread.

An enhanced risk day indicates that there is a greater threat for severe weather than that which would be indicated by a slight risk, but conditions are not adequate for the development of widespread significant severe weather to necessitate a moderate category, with more numerous areas of wind damage (often with wind gusts of 70 miles per hour (110 km/h) to 80 miles per hour (130 km/h)), along with severe hail (occasionally over 2 inches (5.1 cm)) and several tornadoes (in some setups, isolated strong tornadoes are possible). Severe storms are expected to be more concentrated and of varying intensities. These days are quite frequent in the peak severe weather season and occur occasionally at other times of year. This risk category replaced the upper end of "slight" on October 22, 2014, although a few situations that previously warranted a moderate risk were reclassified as enhanced (i.e. 45% wind or 15% tornado with no significant area).

A moderate risk day indicates that more widespread and/or more dangerous severe weather is possible, with significant severe weather often more likely. Numerous tornadoes (some of which may be strong and potentially long-track), more widespread or severe wind damage (often with gusts over 80 miles per hour (130 km/h)) and/or very large/destructive hail (up to or exceeding 3 inches (7.6 cm) in diameter) could occur. Major events, such as large tornado outbreaks or widespread straight-line wind events, are sometimes also possible on moderate risk days, but with greater uncertainty. Moderate risk days are not terribly uncommon, and typically occur several times a month during the peak of the severe weather season, and occasionally at other times of the year. Slight and enhanced risk areas typically surround areas under a moderate risk, where the threat is lower.

A high risk day indicates a considerable likelihood of significant to extreme severe weather, generally a major tornado outbreak or (much less often) an extreme derecho event. On these days, the potential exists for extremely severe and life-threatening weather. This includes a large number of tornadoes - many of which will likely be strong to violent and on the ground for a half-hour or longer, or widespread and very destructive straight-line winds, likely in excess of 100 miles per hour (160 km/h). Hail cannot verify or produce a high risk on its own, although such a day usually involves a threat for widespread very large and damaging hail as well. Many of the most prolific severe weather days were high risk days. Such days are rare; a high risk is typically issued (at the most) only a few times each year (see List of Storm Prediction Center high risk days). High risk areas are usually surrounded by a larger moderate risk area, where uncertainty is greater or the threat is somewhat lower.

The Storm Prediction Center began asking for public comment on proposed categorical additions to the Day 1-3 Convective Outlooks on April 21, 2014, for a two-month period. The Storm Prediction Center broadened this system beginning on October 22, 2014 by adding two new risk categories to the three used originally. The new categories that were added are a "marginal risk" (replacing the "SEE TEXT" contours, see below) and an "enhanced risk". The latter is used to delineate areas where severe weather will occur that would fall under the previous probability criteria of an upper-end slight risk, but do not warrant the issuance of a moderate risk. In order from least to greatest threat, these categories are ranked as: marginal, slight, enhanced, moderate, and high.

=== Conditional Intensity Groups (CIG) ===
In January 2026, the Storm Prediction Center outlined three additional "conditional" risk levels that were implemented in March of the same year. These three levels, titled CIG1, CIG2, and CIG3, are utilized to communicate increasing intensity of significant severe weather hazards on a conditional basis.

=== Issuance and usage ===
Categorical outlook and Conditional Intensity Group conversion
Tornado probability to categorical outlook/CIG conversion (Days 1–2)
Outlook probability	<CIG1	CIG1	CIG2	CIG3
2%	MRGL	MRGL	SLGT	not used
5%	SLGT	SLGT	ENH	not used
10%	SLGT	ENH	ENH	ENH
15%	ENH	ENH	MDT	MDT
30%	ENH	MDT	HIGH	HIGH
45%	ENH	MDT	HIGH	HIGH
60%	ENH	HIGH	HIGH	HIGH
Wind probability to categorical outlook/CIG conversion (Days 1–2)
Outlook probability	<CIG1	CIG1	CIG2	CIG3
5%	MRGL	MRGL	SLGT	not used
15%	SLGT	SLGT	ENH	not used
30%	SLGT	ENH	ENH	not used
45%	ENH	ENH	MDT	HIGH
60%	ENH	MDT	HIGH	HIGH
75%	ENH	MDT	HIGH	HIGH
90%	ENH	MDT	HIGH	HIGH
Hail probability to categorical outlook/CIG conversion (Days 1–2)
Outlook probability	<CIG1	CIG1	CIG2	
5%	MRGL	MRGL	SLGT	
15%	SLGT	SLGT	ENH	
30%	SLGT	ENH	ENH	
45%	ENH	ENH	MDT	
60%	ENH	MDT	MDT	
Total severe probability to categorical outlook/CIG conversion (Day 3)
Outlook probability	<CIG1	CIG1	CIG2	
5%	MRGL	MRGL	SLGT	
15%	SLGT	SLGT	ENH	
30%	SLGT	ENH	ENH	
45%	ENH	ENH	MDT	
60%	ENH	MDT	MDT	

Day 4–8 probability to categorical outlook conversion
Outlook probability	Combined TORN, WIND, and HAIL
< 15%	No Area
15%	Severe (15%)
30%	Severe (30%)

Convective outlooks are issued by the Storm Prediction Center in Zulu time (also known as Universal Coordinated Time or UTC).

The categories at right refer to the risk levels for the specific severe weather event occurring within 25 miles (40 km) of any point in the delineated region, as described in the previous section. The Day 1 Convective Outlook, issued five times per day at 0600Z (valid from 1200Z of the current day until 1200Z the following day), 1300Z and 1630Z (the "morning updates", valid until 1200Z the following day), 2000Z (the "afternoon update", valid until 1200Z the following day), and the 0100Z (the "evening update", valid until 1200Z the following day), provides a textual forecast, map of categories and probabilities, and chart of probabilities. Prior to January 28, 2020, the Day 1 was currently the only outlook to issue specific probabilities for tornadoes, hail or wind. It is the most descriptive and highest accuracy outlook, and typically has the highest probability levels.

Day 2 outlooks, issued twice daily at 0600Z in Daylight Saving Time or 0700Z in Standard Time and 1730Z, refer to predicted risks of convective weather for the following day (1200Z to 1200Z of the next calendar day; for example, a Day 2 outlook issued on April 12, 2100, would be valid from 1200Z on April 13, 2100, through 1200Z on April 14, 2100) and include only a categorical outline, textual description, and a map of categories and probabilities. Day 2 moderate risks are fairly uncommon, and a Day 2 high risk has only been issued three times (for April 7, 2006, April 14, 2012, and March 15, 2025). Probabilities for tornadoes, hail and wind applying to the Day 1 Convective Outlook were incorporated into the Day 2 Convective Outlook on January 28, 2020, citing research to SPC operations and improvements in numerical forecast guidance that have increased forecaster confidence in risk estimation for those hazards in that timeframe. The individual hazard probabilistic forecasts replaced the existing "total severe" probability graph for general severe convective storms that had been used for the Day 2 outlook beforehand.

"Hazard Intensites in SPC MDs and Outlooks", a presentation on the future of convective outlooks by the SPC

Day 3 outlooks refer to the day after tomorrow, issued twice daily since August 13, 2024 at 0730Z in Daylight Saving Time or 0830Z in Standard Time and 1930Z and include the same products (categorical outline, text description, and probability graph) as the Day 2 outlook. As of June 2012, the SPC forecasts general thunderstorm risk areas. Higher probability forecasts are less and less likely as the forecast period increases due to lessening forecast ability farther in advance. Day 3 moderate risks are quite rare; these have been issued only twenty-two times since the product became operational (most recently for April 28, 2025). Day 3 high risks are never issued and the operational standards do not allow for such. This is most likely because it would require both a very high degree of certainty (60%) for an event which was still at least 48 hours away and a reasonable level of confidence that said severe thunderstorm outbreak would include significant severe weather (EF2+ tornadoes, hurricane-force winds, and/or egg-sized hail).

Day 4–8 outlooks are the longest-term official SPC Forecast Product, and often change significantly from day to day. This extended forecast for severe weather was an experimental product until March 22, 2007, when the Storm Prediction Center incorporated it as an official product. Areas are delineated in this forecast that have least a 15% or 30% chance of severe weather in the Day 4–8 period (equivalent to a slight risk and an enhanced risk, respectively); as forecaster confidence is not fully resolute on how severe weather will evolve more than three days out, the Day 4–8 outlook only outlines the areas in which severe thunderstorms are forecast to occur during the period at the 15% and 30% likelihood, and does not utilize other categorical risk areas or outline where general (non-severe) thunderstorm activity will occur.

Local forecast offices of the National Weather Service, radio and television stations, and emergency planners often use the forecasts to gauge the potential severe weather threats to their areas. Even after the marginal and enhanced risk categories were added in October 2014, some television stations have continued to use the original three-category system to outline forecasted severe weather risks (though stations that do this may utilize in-house severe weather outlooks that vary to some degree from the SPC convective outlooks), while certain others that have switched to the current system have chosen not to outline marginal risk areas.

Generally, the convective outlook boundaries or lines – general thunderstorms (light green), marginal (dark green), slight (yellow), enhanced (orange), moderate (red) and high (purple) – will be continued as an arrow or line not filled with color if the risk area enters another country (Canada or Mexico) or across waters beyond the United States coastline. This indicates that the risk for severe weather is also valid in that general area of the other side of the border or oceanic boundary.

== Mesoscale discussions ==
SPC mesoscale discussions (MDs) once covered convection (mesoscale convective discussions [MCDs]) and precipitation (mesoscale precipitation discussions [MPDs]); MPDs are now issued by the Weather Prediction Center (WPC). MCDs generally precede the issuance of a tornado or severe thunderstorm watch, by one to three hours when possible. Mesoscale discussions are designed to give local forecasters an update on a region where a severe weather threat is emerging and an indication of whether a watch is likely and details thereof, as well as situations of isolated severe weather when watches are not necessary. MCDs contain meteorological information on what is happening and what is expected to occur in the next few hours, and forecast reasoning in regard to weather watches. Mesoscale discussions are often issued to update information on watches already in effect, and sometimes when one is to be canceled. Mesoscale discussions are occasionally used as advance notice of a categorical upgrade of a scheduled convective outlook.

=== Example ===
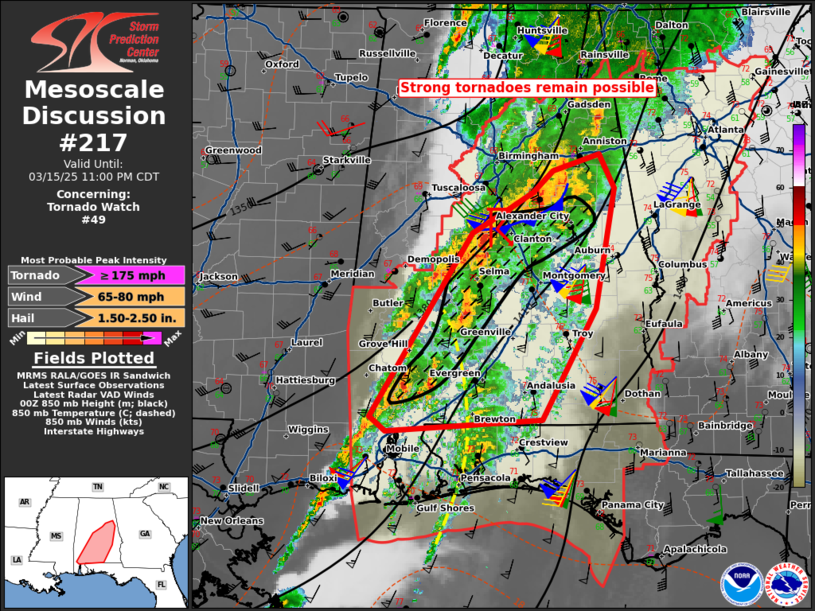
Graphic associated with the example mesoscale discussion

   Mesoscale Discussion 0217
   NWS Storm Prediction Center Norman OK
   0900 PM CDT Sat Mar 15 2025

   Areas affected...much of central Alabama

   Concerning...Tornado Watch 49...

   Valid 160200Z - 160400Z

   The severe weather threat for Tornado Watch 49 continues.

   SUMMARY...The risk of strong tornadoes persists over watch area,
   especially over central Alabama.

   DISCUSSION...In the wake of tornadic storms which went across the
   BMX radar, a residual region of outflow remains across parts of
   Shelby, Talladega, Chilton and Coosa counties. Meanwhile, a very
   large complex of storms is coming up from the southwest. Very strong
   inflow winds exist ahead of this complex, which will continue to
   feed these storms and possibly enhance lift along the residual
   outflow from the earlier storms. Given over 400 m2/s2 0-1 SRH, it is
   possible that any interaction with the boundary could result in a
   strong tornado.

   The environment remains favorable extending farther south as well,
   where a north-south confluence line is noted ahead of the primary
   cold front, and including the Wilcox County cell.

   ..Jewell.. 03/16/2025

=== Meso-gamma mesoscale discussion ===
SPC mesoscale discussions for a high-impact and high-confidence strong tornadoes (EF2+) or winds greater than 100 miles per hour (160 km/h) are called meso-gamma mesoscale discussions. Meso-gamma mesoscale discussions are rarely issued by the SPC. As of March 2025, the Storm Prediction Center has issued 44 meso-gamma mesoscale discussions.

== Weather watches ==
Watches (WWs) issued by the SPC are generally less than 20,000–50,000 square miles (52,000–129,000 km^{2}) in area and are normally preceded by a mesoscale discussion. Watches are intended to be issued preceding the arrival of severe weather by one to six hours. They indicate that conditions are favorable for thunderstorms capable of producing various modes of severe weather, including large hail, damaging straight-line winds and/or tornadoes. In the case of severe thunderstorm watches organized severe thunderstorms are expected but conditions are not thought to be especially favorable for tornadoes (although they can occur in such areas where one is in effect, and some severe thunderstorm watch statements issued by the SPC may note a threat of isolated tornadic activity if conditions are of modest favorability for storm rotation capable of inducing them), whereas for tornado watches conditions are thought to be favorable for severe thunderstorms to produce tornadoes.

In situations where a forecaster expects a significant threat of extremely severe and life-threatening weather, a watch with special enhanced wording, "Particularly Dangerous Situation" (PDS), is subjectively issued. It is occasionally issued with tornado watches, normally for the potential of major tornado outbreaks, especially those with a significant threat of multiple tornadoes capable of producing F4/EF4 and F5/EF5 damage and/or staying on the ground for long-duration – sometimes uninterrupted – paths. A PDS severe thunderstorm watch is very rare and is typically reserved for derecho events impacting densely populated areas.

Watches are not "warnings", where there is an immediate severe weather threat to life and property. Although severe thunderstorm and tornado warnings are ideally the next step after watches, watches cover a threat of organized severe thunderstorms over a larger area and may not always precede a warning; watch "busts" do sometimes occur should thunderstorm activity not occur at all or that which does develop never reaches the originally forecast level of severity. Warnings are issued by local National Weather Service offices, not the Storm Prediction Center, which is a national guidance center.

The process of issuing a convective watch begins with a conference call from SPC to local NWS offices. If after collaboration a watch is deemed necessary, the Storm Prediction Center will issue a watch approximation product which is followed by the local NWS office issuing a specific county-based watch product. The latter product is responsible for triggering public alert messages via television, radio stations and NOAA Weather Radio. The watch approximation product outlines specific regions covered by the watch (including the approximate outlined area in statute miles) and its time of expiration (based on the local time zone(s) of the areas under the watch), associated potential threats, a meteorological synopsis of atmospheric conditions favorable for severe thunderstorm development, forecasted aviation conditions, and a pre-determined message informing the public of the meaning behind the watch and to be vigilant of any warnings or weather statements that may be issued by their local National Weather Service office.

Watch outline products provide a visual map depiction of the issued watch; the SPC typically delineates watches within this product in the form of "boxes", which technically are represented as either squares, rectangles (horizontal or vertical) or parallelograms depending on the area it covers. Jurisdictions outlined by the county-based watch product as being included in the watch area may differ from the actual watch box; as such, certain counties, parishes or boroughs not covered by the fringes of the watch box may actually be included in the watch and vice versa. Watches can be expanded, contracted (by removing jurisdictions where SPC and NWS forecasters no longer consider there to be a viable threat of severe weather, in which case, the watch box may take on a trapezoidal representation in map-based watch products) or canceled before their set time of expiration by local NWS offices.

=== Example ===
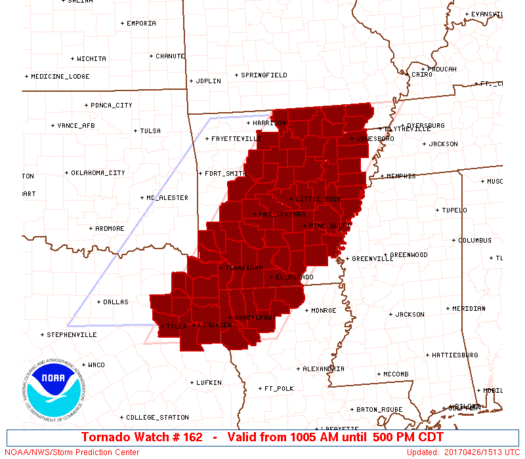
Graphic associated with the example watch

URGENT - IMMEDIATE BROADCAST REQUESTED
   Tornado Watch Number 162
   NWS Storm Prediction Center Norman OK
   1005 AM CDT Wed Apr 26 2017

   The NWS Storm Prediction Center has issued a

   * Tornado Watch for portions of
     Much of Arkansas
     Northwest Louisiana
     Northeast Texas

   * Effective this Wednesday morning and afternoon from 1005 AM
     until 500 PM CDT.

   * Primary threats include...
     A few tornadoes likely with a couple intense tornadoes possible
     Widespread large hail likely with isolated very large hail
       events to 2 inches in diameter possible
     Widespread damaging wind gusts to 70 mph likely

   SUMMARY...Severe storms will move across the watch area through this
   afternoon, posing a risk of locally damaging winds, large hail, and
   a few tornadoes.  An isolated strong tornado or two is also
   possible.

   The tornado watch area is approximately along and 90 statute miles
   east and west of a line from 25 miles north of Walnut Ridge AR to 35
   miles southeast of Longview TX. For a complete depiction of the
   watch see the associated watch outline update (WOUS64 KWNS WOU2).

   PRECAUTIONARY/PREPAREDNESS ACTIONS...

   REMEMBER...A Tornado Watch means conditions are favorable for
   tornadoes and severe thunderstorms in and close to the watch
   area. Persons in these areas should be on the lookout for
   threatening weather conditions and listen for later statements
   and possible warnings.

   &&

— Source:

== Fire weather products ==
Day 3–8 probability to categorical fire weather outlook conversion
Outlook probability	CRITICAL	DRY TSTM
< 10%	not used	No Area
10%	not used	ELEVATED
< 40%	No Area	not used
40%	ELEVATED	CRITICAL
70%	CRITICAL	not used

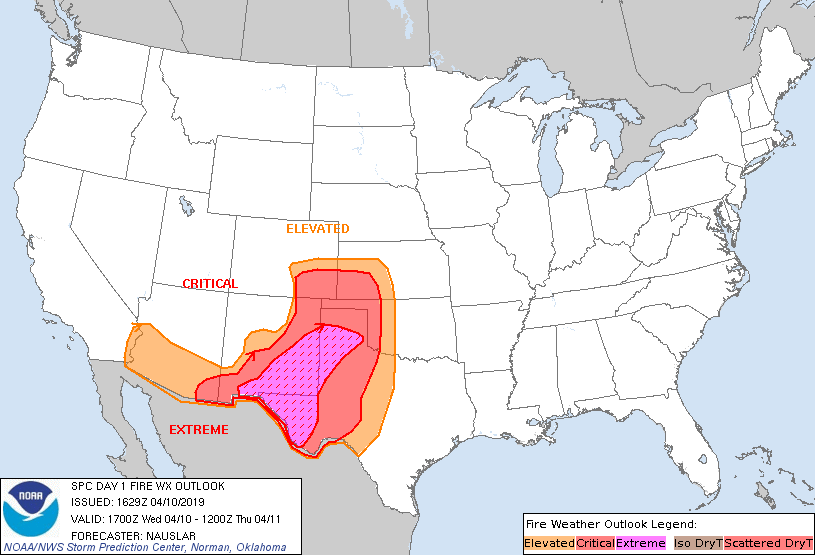
Day 1 Fire Outlook map issued by the Storm Prediction Center on April 10, 2019, depicting extremely critical fire conditions over portions of New Mexico and Texas

The Storm Prediction Center also is responsible for issuing fire weather outlooks (FWD) for the continental United States. These outlooks are a guidance product for local, state and federal government agencies, including local National Weather Service offices, in forecasting the potential for wildfires. The outlooks issued are for Day 1, Day 2, and Days 3–8. The Day 1 product is issued at 4:00 a.m. Central Time and is updated at 1700Z, and is valid from 1200Z to 1200Z the following day. The Day 2 outlook is issued at 1000Z and is updated at 2000Z for the forecast period of 1200Z to 1200Z the following day. The Day 3–8 outlook is issued at 2200Z, and is valid from 1200Z two days after the current calendar date to 1200Z seven days after the current calendar date.

There are four types of Fire Weather Outlook areas: "See Text", a "Critical Fire Weather Area for Wind and Relative Humidity", an "Extremely Critical Fire Weather Area for Wind and Relative Humidity", and a "Critical Fire Weather Area for Dry Thunderstorms". The outlook type depends on the forecast weather conditions, severity of the predicted threat, and local climatology of a forecast region. "See Text" is a map label used for outlining areas where fire potential is great enough to pose a limited threat, but not enough to warrant a critical area, similar to areas using the same notation title that were formerly outlined in convective outlooks. Critical Fire Weather Areas for Wind and Relative Humidity are typically issued when strong winds ( > 20 mph (32 km/h); 15 mph (24 km/h) for Florida) and low relative humidity (usually < 20%) are expected to occur where dried fuels exist, similar to a slight, enhanced, or moderate risk of severe weather. Critical Fire Weather Areas for Dry Thunderstorms are typically issued when widespread or numerous thunderstorms producing rainfall of little accumulation to provide sufficient ground wetting ( < 0.10 inches (2.5 mm)) are expected to occur where dried fuels exist. Extremely Critical Fire Weather Areas for Wind and Relative Humidity are issued when very strong winds and very low humidity are expected to occur with very dry fuels. Extremely Critical areas are issued relatively rarely, similar to the very low frequency of high risk areas in convective outlooks (see List of Storm Prediction Center extremely critical days).

== See also ==
- National Weather Service Norman, Oklahoma – the Weather Forecast Office located adjacent to the Storm Prediction Center within the National Weather Center, which serves central and western Oklahoma and northwestern Texas
- Severe weather terminology (United States)
- Chris Broyles, current SPC forecaster
- Roger Edwards, former SPC forecaster
- Robert H. Johns, former SPC forecaster
- John E. Hales Jr., former SPC forecaster
- Larry Wilson. former SPC forecaster
