= Robert C. Miller =

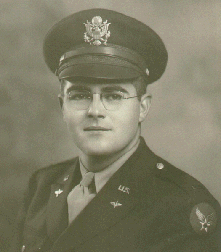
- Born: 1920
- Died: 1998 (aged 77–78)
- Military career
- Allegiance: United States
- Branch: United States Army Air Forces; United States Air Force
- Service years: 1942–1965
- Rank: Colonel
- Other work: Meteorologist
- Scientific career
- Known for: Tornado and convective storm forecasting
- Awards: Clarence Leroy Meisinger Award
- Fields: Meteorology
- Workplaces: USAAF, USAF, federal civil service, consultant

Col. Robert C. Miller, USAF (1920–1998), was an American meteorologist, who pioneered severe convective storms forecasting and applied research, developing an empirical forecasting method, identifying many features associated with severe thunderstorms, a forecast checklist and manuals, and is known for the first official tornado forecast (1948 Tinker Air Force Base tornadoes), and it verified, in 1948.
