= John E. Hales Jr. =

American meteorologist (1942–2024)

John E. Hales Jr
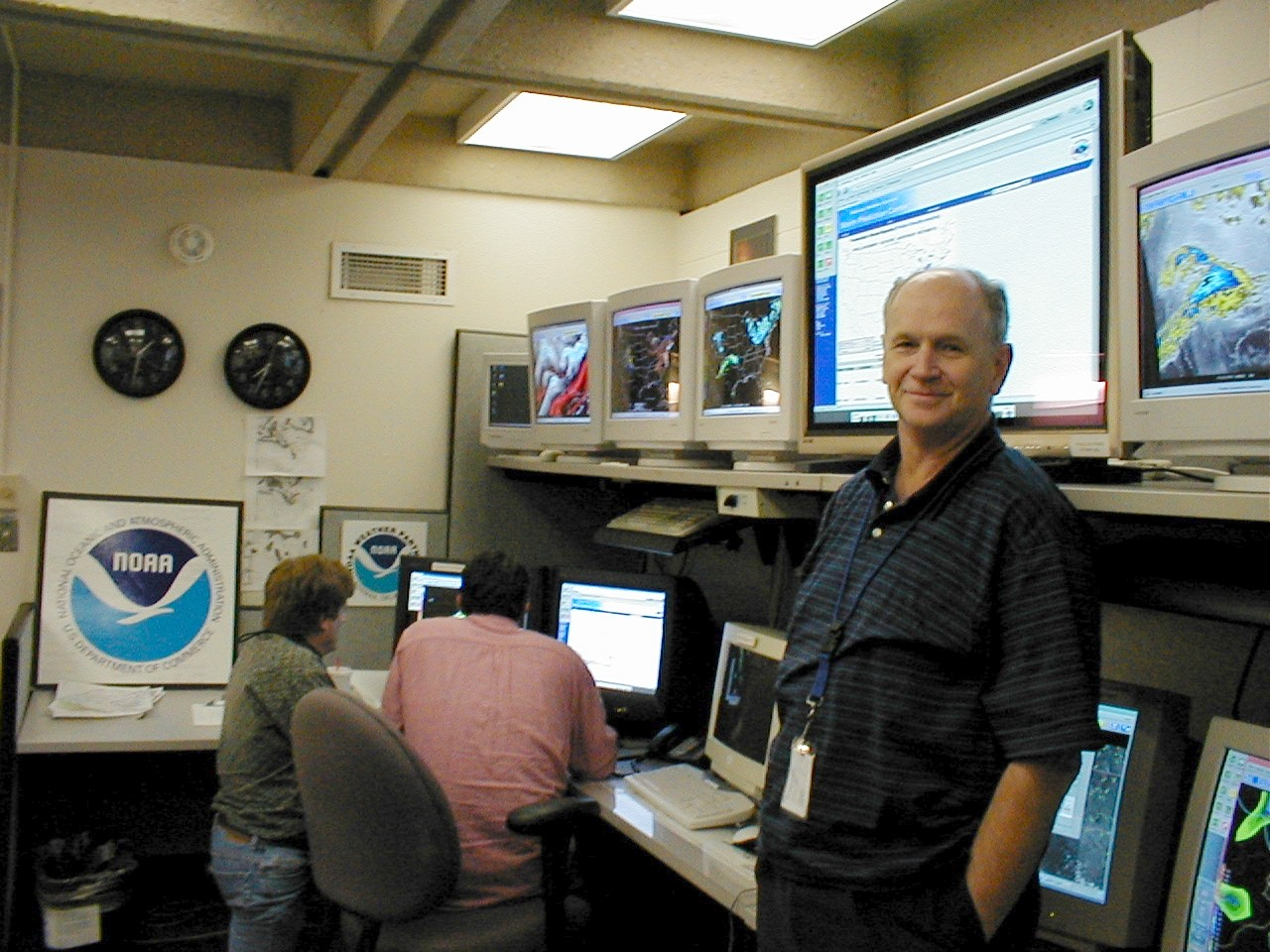
- Jack Hales around 2003
- Born: June 11, 1942; Long Beach, California, United States
- Died: May 20, 2024 (aged 81); Star Valley Ranch, Wyoming, United States
- Education: University of Utah
- Known for: Severe storms forecasting
- Spouse: Susan Hales
- Children: 5
- Awards: U.S. Department of Commerce Gold Medal & National Weather Association Special Lifetime Achievement Award
- Scientific career
- Fields: Meteorology
- Workplaces: National Weather Service; Storm Prediction Center
- Website: www.starvalleyweather.com

John Ernest Hales Jr. (June 11, 1942 – May 20, 2024) was an American meteorologist who studied severe convective storms and tornadoes.

Hales was a forecaster for large storms at the Storm Prediction Center (SPC) in Norman, Oklahoma, formerly known as the National Severe-Storms Forecast Center (NSSFC) in Kansas City, Missouri. He worked at the National Weather Service (NWS), and then served as an SPC forecaster from 1975 until his retirement in 2011.

== Life and career ==
Born in Long Beach, California, Hales spent his childhood in Claremont and Whittier. He attended the University of Utah, where he earned a bachelor's degree in 1965 and a master's in 1967, both in meteorology.

Hales's career started with the United States Weather Bureau (USWB) in the student trainee program while still an undergraduate. His first task was at the Bakersfield, California airport office, where he recorded surface observations during the summer of 1962. In 1963, he worked at the Los Angeles forecast office, where he participated in a local sea-breeze research project, which involved releasing pilot balloons (PIBALs) near Lake Elsinore, California to assess the vertical wind structure in the lower atmosphere.

After completing graduate school in 1967, Hales resumed his career with the USWB as a weather observer at the Seattle-Tacoma airport. Two years later, he became a general forecaster at the Phoenix, Arizona weather office, where he was responsible for creating adaptive forecasts under the guidance of the Albuquerque, New Mexico district forecast office. In 1972, Phoenix became the state forecast office for Arizona as part of a major NWS field structure reorganization. At this time, Hales became a lead forecaster at Phoenix, working as a shift leader for all forecast and warning activities in the state while on duty.

His research on the U.S. Southwest Monsoon resulted in his appointment as a severe local storms lead forecaster in 1975 at the NSSFC in Kansas City, Missouri. He held this position for 36 years.

=== Storm Prediction Center career ===
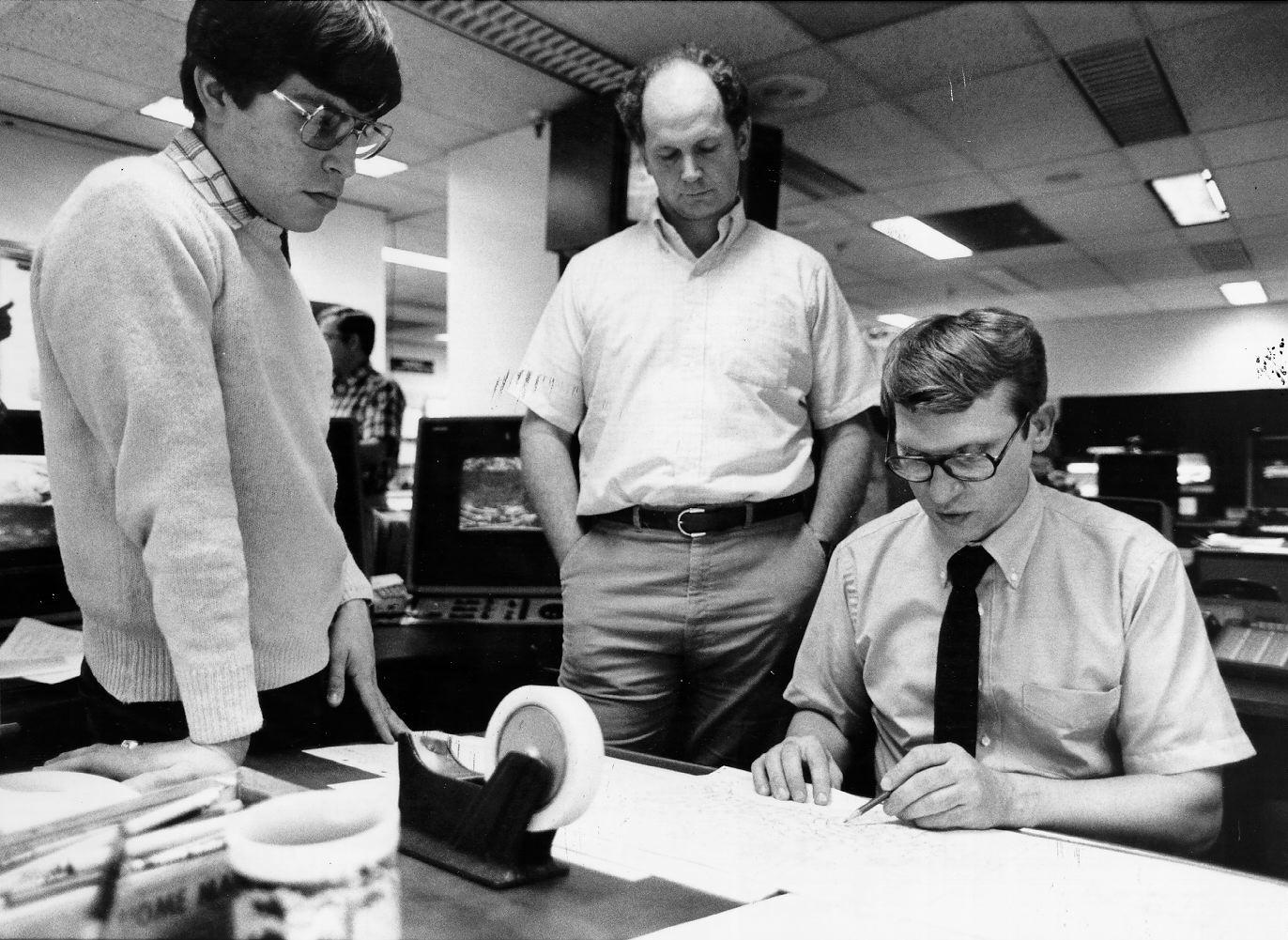
Steve Corfidi (L), Jack Hales (C), and Bob Johns (R) during a shift briefing at NSSFC/SELS in 1984.

Hales was an SPC lead forecaster from 1975 to 2011. Over 36 years, he issued 5,540 severe thunderstorm and tornado watches, multiple of which had been associated with significant U.S. severe weather events.

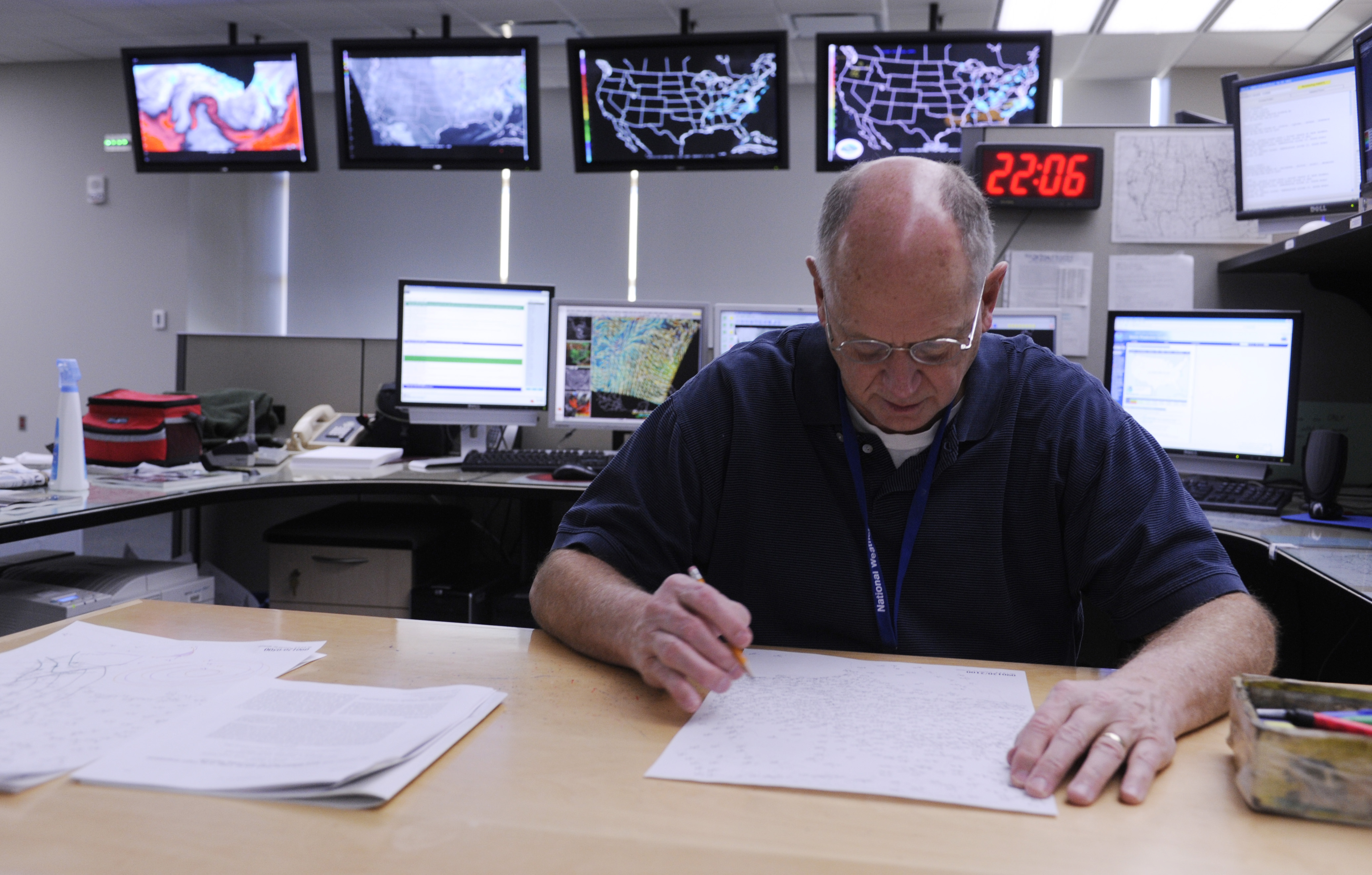
Jack Hales at work in 2009

Hales advocated for future products and services at the NSSFC and SPC. Historically, severe weather outlooks were issued for the current day only, and this continued from 1952 through 1985. However, as numerical weather prediction models continued to develop into the 1980s and extended the range of meteorological guidance, Hales advocated for the issuance of a severe weather outlook product starting two days in advance (the Day-Two Outlook). This change was made in 1986. In the same year, Hales also helped design a new, short-term Mesoscale Convective Discussion (MCD) product that addressed severe thunderstorm potential over mesoscale (roughly 200-1,000 km²) areas in the next 2-6 hours. The MCD contained technical information on topics such as storm trends and potential watch issuance in the next several hours. This filled a gap between longer-term outlook products and short-term watches from SPC.

=== Death ===
On 20 May 2024, Hales passed away due to complications from bladder cancer.

== Research ==
Hales's research contributed to understanding and predicting severe thunderstorms and tornadoes. His early work addressed Arizona monsoonal thunderstorms and tornado occurrences in the Los Angeles Basin, and was among the early research efforts aimed at improving the forecasting of these phenomena.

While stationed in Phoenix, Hales researched the meteorological conditions of Arizona summer thunderstorms and the Southwest United States monsoon. He demonstrated that the primary moisture source for desert Southwest U.S. thunderstorms originates from the Pacific Ocean, transported northward through low-level moisture surges from the Gulf of California. Prior to this work, it was widely accepted that moisture from either the Gulf of Mexico or the Pacific Ocean played key roles in driving the southwest monsoon. Hales’ data collection and analysis indicated that moisture from the Gulf of California was a key source.

Hales also conducted early analyses of westward-moving, intense thunderstorm clusters across the Southwestern United States, commonly referred to as Haboobs, Chubascos, or Sonora storms. By integrating satellite, radar, and surface observations, he documented the structure and movement of a particularly damaging event in 1973, contributing to scientific understanding of long-lived convective systems in desert environments.

In studies of tornadoes affecting the Los Angeles Basin, Hales documented synoptic patterns and meteorological parameters associated with tornado and waterspout development in the region. This allowed the improved prediction of these hazards. Another contribution of this work was identifying the role of orographic forcing in shaping low-level wind-field patterns that support the development of shallow super-cells affecting the basin.

He participated in additional research on extreme weather events and operational severe storm forecasting. These efforts included analyses of the Kansas City flash flood of 12 September 1977 and the "Palm Sunday II" tornado outbreak of 1994. He also developed the concept of "significant severe thunderstorms and tornadoes" to classify events with greater societal impact and damage potential, including storms producing hail at least 2 inches in diameter, wind gusts of at least 75 mph, or particularly intense tornadoes rated at least EF2 on the Enhanced Fujita scale.

Hales was a contributor to the annual SPC severe events technical report series, a predecessor of the current SPC web-based events archive. He also served as a mentor to students participating in the Research Experiences for Undergraduates program at the National Weather Center in Norman.

== Awards ==
- 1982 – Silver Medal (Joint Organization Award), U.S. Department of Commerce
- 1986 – Charles L. Mitchell Award, American Meteorological Society
- 1993 – Elected Fellow of the American Meteorological Society
- 2001 – Silver Medal (Joint Organization Award), U.S. Department of Commerce
- 2004 – Gold Medal (Joint Organization Award), U.S. Department of Commerce
- 2008 – Bronze Medal (Joint Organization Award), U.S. Department of Commerce
- 2009 – Bronze Medal (Joint Organization Award), U.S. Department of Commerce
- 2011 – NOAA Distinguished Career Award
- 2011 – National Weather Association Special Lifetime Achievement Award
- 2014 – University of Utah Department of Atmospheric Sciences Distinguished Alumni Award
