= List of meteorologists =

== A–B ==
- Cleveland Abbe
- Aristotle
- June Bacon-Bercey
- David Bates
- Francis Beaufort
- Tor Bergeron
- Jacob Bjerknes
- Vilhelm Bjerknes
- Howard B. Bluestein
- Bert Bolin
- Léon Teisserenc de Bort
- Harold E. Brooks
- Keith Browning
- David Brunt
- C.H.D. Buys Ballot
- Horace R. Byers

== C–D ==
- Matthew Cappucci
- DaNa Carlis
- Jule Gregory Charney
- Coching Chu
- Isaac Cline
- Balfour Currie
- John Dalton
- Robert Davies-Jones
- William Morris Davis
- Igor Delijanić
- Jean-André Deluc
- Charles A. Doswell III
- Heinrich Wilhelm Dove

== E–F ==
- V. Walfrid Ekman
- Kerry Emanuel
- John Farrah
- William Ferrel
- Rich Fields
- John Park Finley
- Michael Fish
- Robert FitzRoy
- Bert Foord
- Benjamin Franklin
- Tetsuya Theodore Fujita

== G–H ==
- Francis Galton
- Audronė Galvonaitė
- Allison Göhler
- Ernest Gold
- William M. Gray
- Thomas P. Grazulis
- Willis Ray Gregg
- George Hadley
- John E. Hales Jr.
- Edmond Halley
- Julius von Hann
- Kenneth Hare
- Ingrid Holford
- Brian Hoskins
- Luke Howard

== J–K ==
- Robert Johns
- Jan-Erik Johnsen
- John Knox
- Wladimir Köppen
- Shen Kuo

== L–O ==
- Hubert Lamb
- Christopher Landsea
- Leslie R. Lemon
- Johannes Letzmann
- Richard Lindzen
- Mònica López
- Edward Norton Lorenz
- David M. Ludlum
- Paul Markowski
- Charles F. Marvin
- Cliff Mass
- Patrick McTaggart-Cowan
- Pomponius Mela
- Milutin Milanković
- James T. Moore
- Joel Myers
- Aili Nurminen
- Isidoro Orlanski

== P–R ==
- Erik Palmén
- Allen Pearson
- Sir Cuthbert Peek, 2nd Baronet
- Jan Pelleboer
- Sverre Petterssen
- José P. Piexoto
- Ron Przybylinski
- William John Macquorn Rankine
- Gandikota V. Rao
- Erik N. Rasmussen
- Lewis Fry Richardson
- Carl-Gustav Arvid Rossby
- François van Rysselberghe

== S–T ==
- Horace-Bénédict de Saussure
- Gil Simmons
- Bob Simpson
- James Stagg
- John Strutt, 3rd Baron Rayleigh
- George James Symons
- Geoffrey Ingram Taylor
- Tetsu Tamura
- Reed Timmer

== U–V ==
- Vilho Väisälä
- Bernard Vonnegut

== W–Z ==
- Roger Wakimoto
- Alfred Wegener
- Heinrich von Wild
- Larry Wilson
- Edgar W. Woolard
- Joshua Wurman
- Rely Zlatarovic
- Nadia Zyncenko

== Weather presenters ==
- Benjamin Abell
- Derek Brockway
- Jim Cantore
- Suzanne Charlton
- Spencer Christian
- Barbara Edwards
- Gary England
- Elise Finch
- Michael Fish
- Gregory S. Forbes
- Bill Giles
- Dick Goddard
- Mel Goldstein
- Gerrit Hiemstra
- John Hope
- Janice Huff
- Colleen Jones
- Ulrika Jonsson
- Jörg Kachelmann
- Don Kent
- John Kettley
- David Letterman
- Siân Lloyd
- Ian McCaskill
- Jan Pelleboer
- Tony Perkins
- Audrey Puente
- Odd Reinsfelt
- Al Roker
- Willard Scott
- Tom Skilling
- James Spann
- Harold Taft
- Harry Volkman
- Wincey Willis

== See also ==
- The Weather Channel
- List of meteorologists on The Weather Channel
- List of Russian meteorologists
