= Johnsen =

Johnsen is a Danish-Norwegian patronymic surname meaning "son of John". Notable people with the surname include:

- Arne Odd Johnsen (1909–1985), Norwegian medieval and economic historian
- Arve Johnsen (born 1934), Norwegian industrial executive and politician
- Bent Inge Johnsen, Norwegian footballer
- Bjarne Johnsen (1892–1984), Norwegian gymnast, 1912 Summer Olympics
- Britton Johnsen (born 1979), American professional basketball player
- Christian Johnsen (born 1977), Norwegian footballer and football manager
- Dawn Johnsen, American lawyer
- Egil Børre Johnsen, Norwegian writer
- Erik Johnsen (born 1965), Norwegian ski jumper
- Erland Johnsen (born 1967), Norwegian footballer and football coach
- Espen Johnsen (born 1979), Norwegian footballer
- Espen Johnsen (politician) (born 1976), Norwegian Member of Parliament for Oppland
- Frode Johnsen (born 1974), Norwegian player of the Japanese football club Nagoya Grampus Eight
- Gina Johnsen, American politician from Michigan
- Gladys Johnsen (born 1942), American politician
- Görel Johnsen (born 1949), manager of the band ABBA
- Grethe Gynnild Johnsen, Norwegian journalist
- Hans Johnsen, American Medal of Honor recipient
- Harvey M. Johnsen, American federal judge
- Håkon Johnsen (1914–1991), Norwegian politician for the Labour Party
- James Roland "Jim" Johnsen, American university president
- Jan-Erik Johnsen (born 1942), Norwegian meteorologist and weather presenter
- Jarl Johnsen (1913–1986), Norwegian boxer
- Jennie Johnsen (born 1977), Norwegian politician for the Liberal Party
- Johan Christian Johnsen (1815–1898), Norwegian politician
- John Johnsen (1892–1984), Norwegian freestyle and backstroke swimmer
- Julia Emily Johnsen (1881-1971), American author and editor
- Justin Meldal-Johnsen (born 1970), bassist with the artist Beck
- Ketil Melsted Johnsen Motzfeldt (1814–1889), Norwegian Minister of the Navy and Minister of Postal Affairs
- Lárus Johnsen (1923–2006), Icelandic chess master
- Linda Johnsen (born 1954), American author on yoga and Hinduism
- Marius Johnsen (born 1981), Norwegian footballer
- Michael Johnsen, Australian politician
- Nikolai Johnsen (born 1988), Norwegian television personality
- Olaus Johnsen, World War I pilot
- Pål Johnsen, Norwegian hockey player
- Per Johnsen, Norwegian sprint canoeist
- Peter Johnsen, American educator at Bradley University
- Robert Johnsen (1896–1975), Danish gymnast, 1920 Summer Olympics
- Ronny Johnsen (born 1969), Norwegian footballer
- Sigbjørn Johnsen (born 1950), Norwegian politician for the Labour Party
- Steinar Sverd Johnsen, Norwegian musician and composer
- Theo A. Johnsen (1857–1911) American manufacturer of ski equipment
- Tor Gunnar Johnsen, Norwegian footballer
- Torhild Johnsen, Norwegian politician for the Christian Democratic Party
- Vibeke Johnsen, Norwegian team handball player
- Wayne Johnsen (born 1977), American boxer

== See also ==
- Castle Bryant Johnsen, television computer artistry group
- Peter Johnsen Rooming House, near Sycamore, Illinois
- Jensen (surname)
- Jenson (name)
- Jonsen
- Jonson
- Johnson (surname)
