= Tetsu Tamura =

Japanese meteorologist

S. Tetsu Tamura 田村 哲
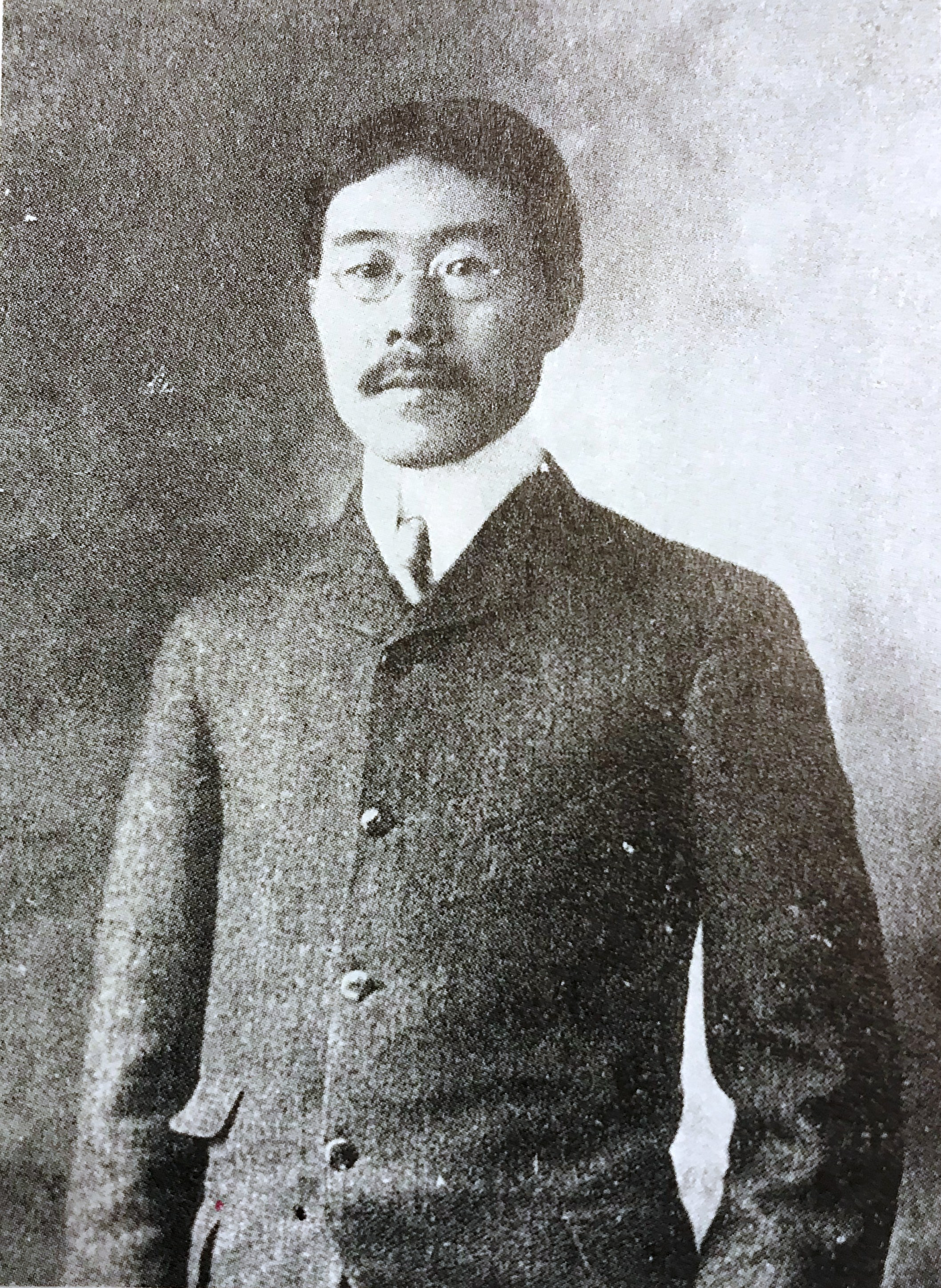
- From the monthly journal Japan and America published by Hajime Hoshi in New York City (May 1903, p. 35)
- Born: Satoru Tamura; October 18, 1876; Yonezawa, Yamagata Prefecture, Japan
- Died: August 19, 1909 (aged 32); Tokyo, Japan
- Education: Aoyama Gakuin University, Simpson College, University of Iowa, Columbia University, Clark University
- Occupations: meteorologist, oceanographer, college professor

Tetsu Tamura (also known as "S. Tetsu Tamura"; birth name: Satoru Tamura); October 18, 1876 – August 19, 1909) was a Japanese meteorologist and oceanographer, who utilized higher mathematics, active in the United States (U.S. National Weather Service) before Syukuro Manabe (2021 Nobel Prize in Physics) and Japan during the Meiji era. Tamura helped Cleveland Abbe (head of the NWS) as his assistant specialized in physico-mathematical theory for three years (1903 – 1906) until his returning to Japan and frequently published articles to Science magazine, Weekly Weather Review, etc. as listed below. He was also a pedagogist of the comparative educational system. He taught at the Naval War College, Tokyo Higher Normal School (now University of Tsukuba), and Waseda University.

== Early life ==
On October 18, 1876 (Meiji 9), Tamura was born in Yonezawa, Yamagata, Japan. He was the third son of Yoshimasa Tamura, a samurai of the Yonezawa Domain (Uesugi clan). In his autobiography, Tamura writes that his father survived the fierce battle of Koguriyama in Hokuetsu (Northern Niigata) during the Boshin War (1868–1869), and that the family was "as poor as a church mouse." In July 1892 (Meiji 25), he was graduated from the Yonezawa Chugakko (now Yamagata Prefectural Yonezawa Kojokan High School), a five-year secondary school run by the Uesugi clan, and left home on March 15 of the following spring to enter the Aoyama Gakuin College (now Aoyama Gakuin University). He worked as a schoolboy and janitor while studying at Aoyama Gakuin College. When he studied higher mathematics by himself in this college, Tamura found some mistakes in a book of "determinants" and communicated with the author. The author's response with appreciation would later encourage him to study abroad.

The event that Seitaro Goto (1867–1935), who was then a lecturer in zoology at Aoyama Gakuin, went to the United States with a scholarship from Johns Hopkins University was the motivation and hope for Tamura's subsequent trip to the United States. Tamura would, in fact, later obtain at least three different scholarships from U.S. universities He was graduated from Aoyama Gakuin College in March 1896 (Meiji 29), as listed in Aoyama Gakuin University Alumni Record (Aoyama Gakuin Resource Center).

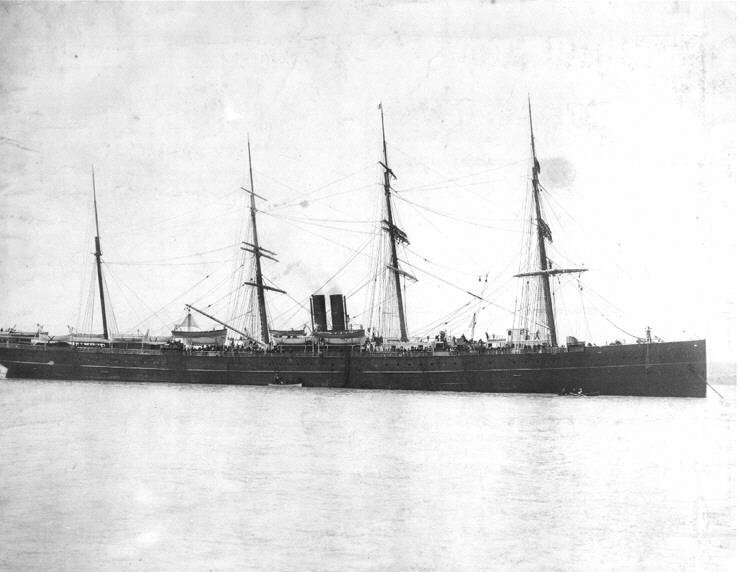
City of Peking anchored in San Francisco Bay, May 1898.

The next year, in April 1897 (Meiji 30), he taught mathematics and English at Aichi Prefectural Normal School in Nagoya, introduced by Nobuta Kishimoto (1866–1928) and Ryokichi Yatabe (1851–1899), and the following year 1898 (Meiji 31), in April, he was ready to travel to the United States. His destination was Simpson College, Indianola, Iowa, where he received his first scholarship. The ship was the City of Peking from Yokohama to San Francisco via Honolulu.

== Study and research in the U.S.A. ==
For the following educational backgrounds and training timelines, while referring to his autographed résumé and his autobiography, "Nine Years Abroad," the inconsistencies and inaccuracies between these two sources are corrected and supplemented by using the records of the related universities in the United States. Many of the contradictions are time-to-day inconsistencies that can be misleading, but the biggest contradiction is the fact that he was enrolled at Simpson College, which appears neither in his résumé nor in his autobiography. Although Funabashi's memorial with a short biography is the only Japanese material mentioned, various materials in the United States below prove Tamura's enrollment at Simpson College.

Elsewhere, the autobiography mentions that he met Kiyoshi Kawakami (1873–1949), an old friend in their hometown Yamagata and also an alumnus of Aoyama Gakuin, at the University of Iowa in 1900, but Kawakami was in Japan until the formation of the Social Democratic Party in May 1901. Thus, Tamura was confused in describing some of the events between 1900 and 1901 (Meiji 33 and Meiji 34).

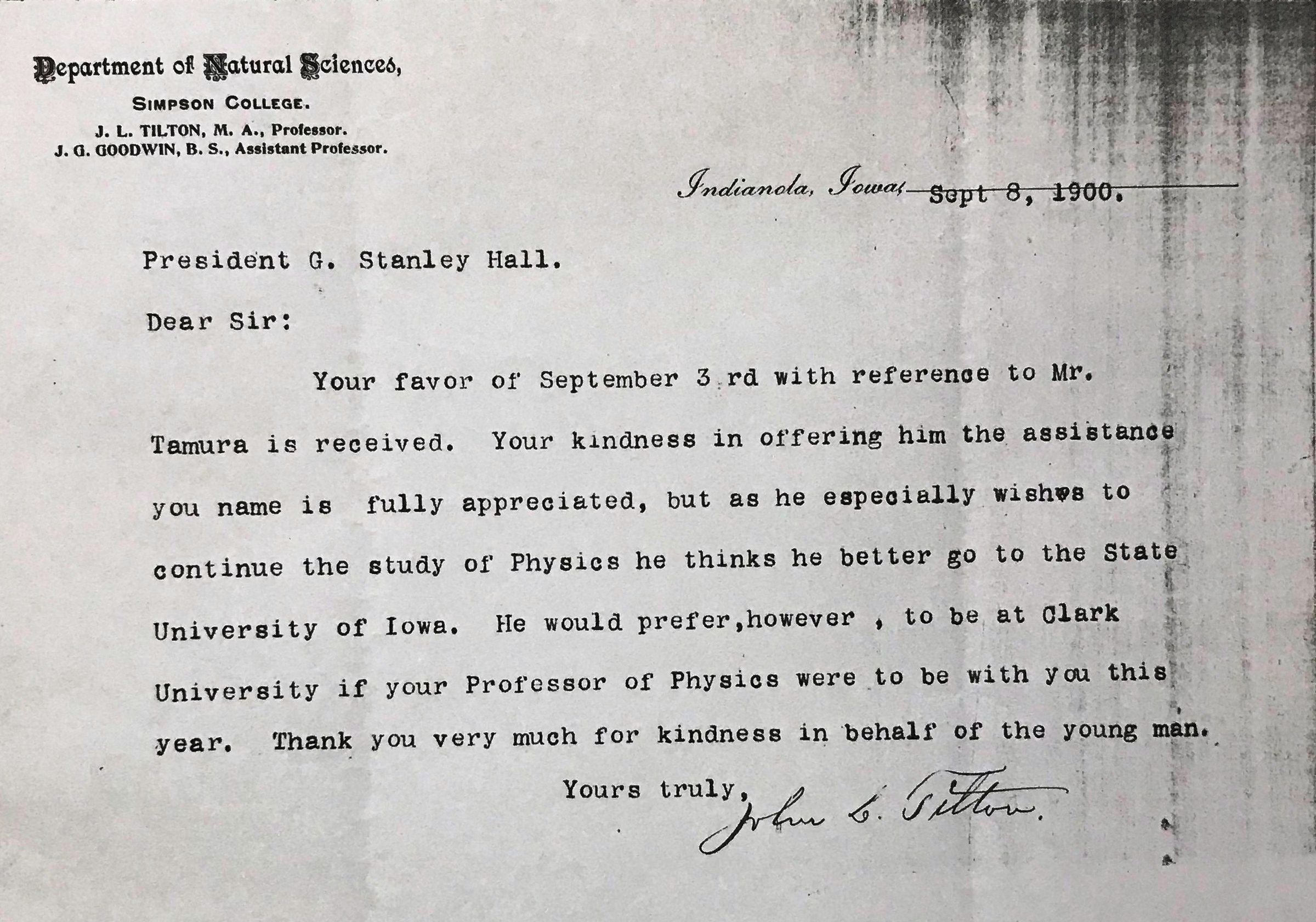
Letter from J.L. Tilton to G. Stanley Hall on 8 September 1900, referring to S. Tetsu Tamura

=== Iowa ===
==== Simpson College (Indianola) ====
Tamura left Yokohama in early April 1898 (Meiji 31) and arrived in San Francisco on the ship City of Peking, which was just before being drafted into naval service for the Spanish-American War that broke out in April, 1898. He then traveled by land via Portland, Oregon to his final destination, Simpson College in Indianola, Iowa. This college was and still is the same Methodist school as Aoyama Gakuin. Immediately after arriving, there were no classes due to summer vacation, and during this time, with the help of the local church, he anonymously wrote and published an English novel entitled Kwaiku based on his own religious history. The novel's "Preface" mentioned that Emma Kate Corkhill, a professor of English literature at Simpson College, helped him for English composition. According to the academic transcript of Professor J.L. Tilton of the Science Department at Simpson University, with a letter of recommendation to G. Stanley Hall, President of Clark University in Worcester, Massachusetts, Tamura's formal coursework began in the fall quarter of 1898. He completed the winter, spring, and fall quarters of 1899 and the winter quarter of 1900. But in the middle of the spring quarter, his credits were transferred from Simpson College to State University of Iowa (now University of Iowa) in Iowa City, Iowa, where he received his B.S. (Bachelor of Science) degree in 1990.

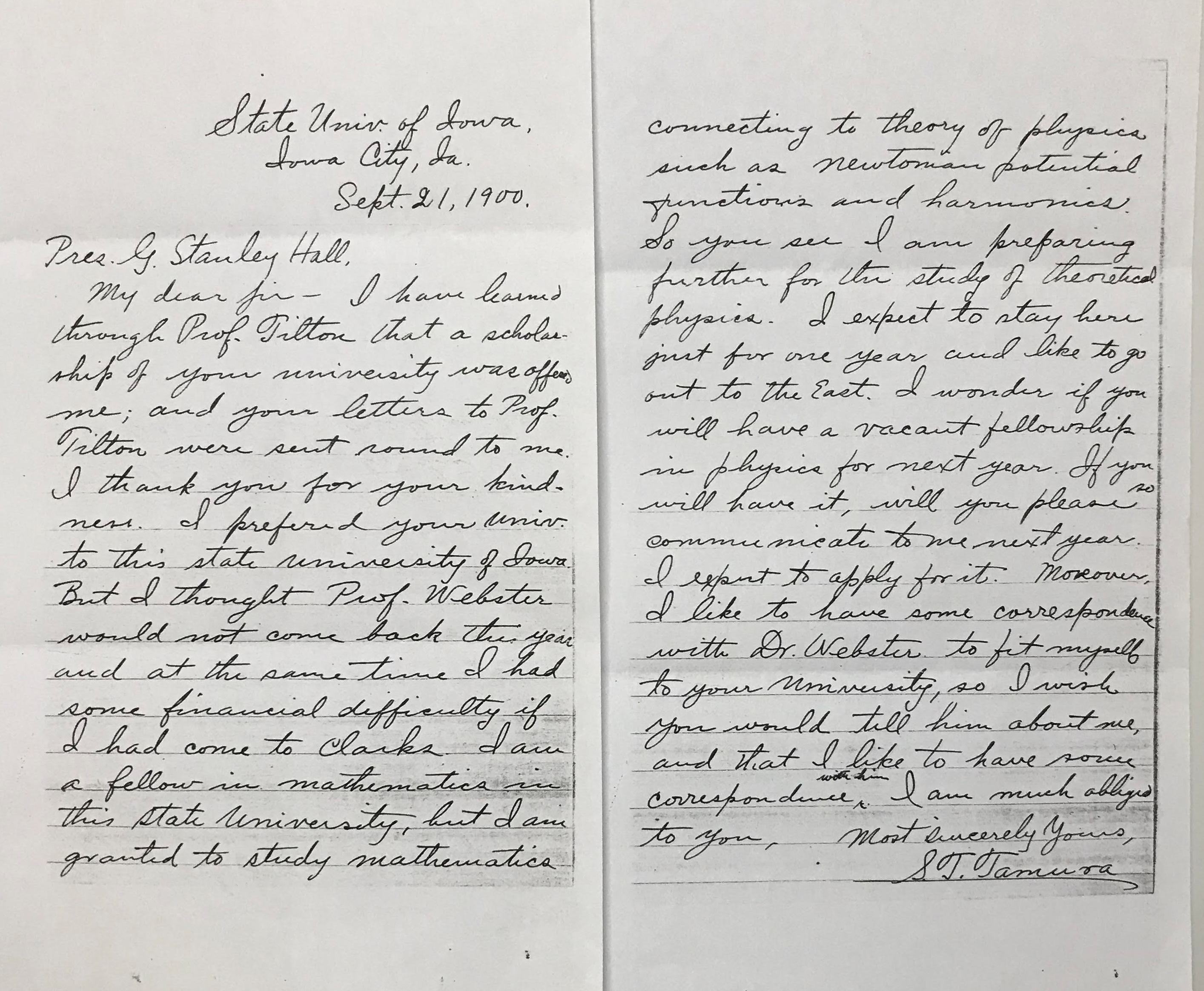
S. Tetsu Tamura's letter to G Stanley Hall on September 21, 1900

==== State University of Iowa (Iowa City), now the University of Iowa ====
The "State University of Iowa" that Tamura wrote about in his résumé and elsewhere is now the "University of Iowa" in Iowa City, not the "Iowa State University" in Ames. Not to be confused. While he spent five quarters at Simpson College, Tamura did not graduate from it, and received his bachelor's degree (B.S.) from State University of Iowa. Tamura first entered Simpson College with the support of the same Methodist Church as Aoyama Gakuin, being admitted as a third-year student (junior) in the fall quarter of 1898, taking into account his graduation from Aoyama Gakuin and his experience as an instructor at the Normal School of Aichi Prefecture (now Aichi University of Education). It was revealed in Tilton's letter of recommendation to G. Stanley Hall, written on the Simpson College letterhead paper mentioned above.

=== East Coast and New England ===
==== Columbia University and Clark University ====
Tamura stayed at State University of Iowa in Iowa City until 1901 (Meiji 34) and became an M.A. (Master of Arts in mathematics) in June. The title of his master's thesis is Applications of Harmonic Analysis to the Study of Vibrating Strings and Membranes (1901) After this, he headed east for the first time to enroll in Columbia University Graduate School in New York City. By the way, prior to this, as a result of sending a letter of recommendation to Clark University, Tamura was actually accepted. However, partially because Arthur Gordon Webster, who was scheduled advisor at Clark University, was going to be out of town for a year, and partially because State University of Iowa also offered him a scholarship, he stayed at the graduate school in Iowa for a year, as revealed in the letter of explanation that Tilton and Tamura themselves sent to Clark University. Staying in Iowa for a year did not cancel Clark University's scholarships. From 1901 (Meiji 34) to the summer of 1902 (Meiji 35), he first studied in the doctoral program at Columbia University under Robert Simpson Woodward, who was then the Dean of the Faculty of Science. Tamura then left New York in the fall, to continue his research at Clark University in New England, as a fellow paid by the promised scholarship. In the summer of 1903 (Meiji 36), he returned to Columbia University.

Tamura's autographed résumé says he got a Ph.D. degree this year, but Tamura's own autobiography is more correct. It was two years later in 1905. Although the dissertation for the degree of Ph.D. (Doctor of Philosophy in pure science) was submitted to Columbia University, the title page clearly states that he was a fellow of both universities, Columbia and Clark. The dissertation was based on a series of meteorological studies in Washington, D.C., as shown in the next section, and the title is Mathematical Theory of the Nocturnal Cooling of the Atmosphere, Parts I and II, which main thesis was published in the April 1905 issue of the Monthly Weather Review (p. 138-147), and was reprinted in a 31-page booklet with a new title page to submit as the dissertation.

==== Washington, D.C. (U.S. Weather Bureau) ====
In September 1903 (Meiji 36), Tamura became an engineer (specialist) at the U.S. Weather Bureau, now the U.S. National Weather Service (NWS) in Silver Spring, Maryland, which was then located in Washington, D.C., with the recommendation of Woodward, Tamura's mentor at Columbia University. It was fortunate that Cleveland Abbe, also a professor at Columbia University, was looking for his assistant or successor who were good at mathematics. Abbe was already 64 years old at the time, and was a leading meteorologist, whom Isaac Asimov later called "the father of the National Weather Service." Abbe had a reputation for being kind and caring for everyone, and in fact, he worked as a matchmaker for Tamura's marriage on Saturday, November 25, 1905 (Meiji 38). In his autobiography, Tamura quotes the words of one of Abbe's alumni, who recalled his unchanging personality, as follows: "Everybody liked Abbe thirty years ago, as everybody likes him now." The series of researches under Abbe were mainly published in the Weather Review (now Monthly Weather Review ISSN 0027-0644) published by the American Meteorological Society (AMS). As mentioned above, with the main paper requesting a degree, they became supporting papers for his dissertation. Some of them are shown in the "Major works" section below.

==== Washington, D.C. (Carnegie Institution and Academia Socializing) ====
In 1904 (Meiji 37), Woodward, Tamura's mentor at Columbia University, was chosen as the second director of the Carnegie Institution of Washington (now Carnegie Institution for Science), which was founded in 1902. Taking this opportunity, Tamura became an advisor to Louis Agricola Bauer at the Department of Terrestrial Magnetism, which was newly established in the same year (1904). He also published papers in this institution. As mentioned above, Tamura's personal and professional life reached his zenith at this time, including his marriage, and he was financially and prestigiously blessed with access to the Washington academia. At the request of the Carnegie Institution, in May 1905 (Meiji 38), he went on a tour of Europe. His business trips were mainly to Switzerland, England, Germany and France. In November of the same year, 1905, he received a Doctor of Science degree (D.Sc.) from George Washington University (GWU).

== Returning to Japan: Teaching at schools and research in meteorology and oceanography ==
=== Why and how Tamura came back to Japan ===
The article on Tamura in the March 1992 issue of Aoyama Gakuho written by Masataka Watanabe was based on the article by Tamura himself in a monthly journal Japan and America (May 1903 issue) published by Shinichi Hoshi's father, Hajime Hoshi, in New York City. The theme of Tamura of the article in Japan and America was criticism of Japanese education. Tamura had been critical of the Japanese educational system, and his autobiography devoted most of its pages to the educational system and its problems. In addition, Tamura from the countryside did not have strong acquaintances in Japan, and he recalled that the United States was comfortable for Tamura and his wife, who was also familiar with the American style of life because she came to the U.S. much earlier than Tamura. His wife came to America in 1894 (Meiji 27) when she was a student at the Kaigan Jogakko (or Coastal Girls' School) of Aoyama Gakuin. They used English at home even after returning home. He was discouraged from returning to Japan for these reasons.

As Tamura published many scientific articles in the U.S., it became known in Japan that there was Tamura in the Meteorological Observatory in Washington. As a result, Tamura's return to Japan was motivated by the strong encouragement of Takematsu Okada, who later became the fourth chief of the Japanese Central Meteorological Observatory, Yuji Wada, a pioneering meteorologist and oceanographer along with Jiro Kitao, and Mikinosuke Miyajima, a parasitologist from Tamura's hometown Yonezawa City: these men asked him to come back to Japan as soon as possible and to work for Japan. Okada promised to give him a position at the Tokyo Higher Normal School (now University of Tsukuba), Wada promised to give him a chance to give lectures on meteorology and oceanography at the Naval War College, and Miyajima often urged Tamura to return to Japan, both during his visits to Washington and in his letters from Japan.

=== Naval War College, Tokyo Higher Normal School, and Waseda University ===
Tamura and his wife returned to Japan at the end of June 1906 (Meiji 39). The title of his autobiography is Nine Years Abroad, but it was a total of nine years, in fact, he spent just eight full years in foreign lands. According to his handwritten résumé, he obtained a position at the Naval War College in September of the same year, as promised by Wada, but there is no record to support this, except for the words "Commissioned at the Naval War College" in the obituary by Okada because of the subsequent dismantling of the Naval War College. In addition, the description in his curriculum vitae is "Professor of Marine Meteorology at the Naval War College," which differs from "Professor at Tokyo Higher Normal School," which he actually took office in November. In other words, the Naval War College gave him only the position of a part-time lecturer for the subject of marine meteorology, while the Tokyo Higher Normal School gave a full "professorship" of the school itself. The record of his professorship at Tokyo Higher Normal School was left at the University of Tsukuba. In the Yearbook of Tokyo Higher Normal School, which was then published every year on May 31, he was listed as "Professor, Meteorology, Yamagata, Shizoku" or "Professor in charge of meteorology, from Yamagata Prefecture, Samurai family" in the three volumes "From April 1907 to March 1908," "From April 1908to March 1909," and "From April 1909 to March 1910."

Tamura was undoubtedly a professor of meteorology at Tokyo Higher Normal School from November 1906 (Meiji 39) to August 1909 (Meiji 42), when he died. By the way, he is listed as a "Yamagata Prefecture samurai" here, but his résumé dated November 1907 (Meiji 40) shows him as a "Tokyo commoner." This is probably because Tamura, the third son, was registered as the head of a new family in Tokyo after being separated from his parents' register in Yonezawa by the marriage. According to "Waseda Daigaku Hyakunenshi (Centennial History of Waseda University)", he was a lecturer in the Literature Departmentand gave lectures on "modern science" from December 1907 to July 1908. His affiliation was surely "Literature Department" (now School of Humanities and Social sciences) because it was before the reopening of Science and Engineering Department (now Faculty of Science and Engineering). His textbook (lecture notes) was published by the university and now housed in Waseda University Library, and other libraries.

=== Research on meteorology and oceanography after returning to Japan ===
At that time, the Tokyo Meteorological Observatory, or "Central Weather Bureau," was under the jurisdiction of the Ministry of Education, but it is now the "Japan Meteorological Agency" of the Ministry of Land, Infrastructure, Transport and Tourism. What Tamura did here is not very clear. It is not even clear what role he played at the Central Weather Bureau. Takematsu Okada, who wrote an obituary to the Central Weather Bureau's Journal of the Meteorological Society of Japan: JMSJ (『気象集誌』), also stated that Tamura was a "member of the Society," but this does not mean anything more than a member of the "Great Japan Meteorological Society" (later the Meteorological Society of Japan). In addition, Okada's list of Tamura's achievements in Japan, other than lecturing on meteorology at various schools, are merely meteorological and oceanographic research and design work for the Japan Hydrographic Office.

The "hydrographic office" mentioned here also appears in the obituary with a short biography of Tamura by Funabashi. It says, "In the Hydrographic Office, he [Tamura] worked for the survey of tidal magnetism as well as the marine meteorology, and at the Ministry of Agriculture and Commerce, he was commissioned to conduct research on the basic fisheries survey." The Hydrographic Office was the Hydrographic Department of the Ministry of the Navy, which is now Marine Information Department of the Japan Coast Guard, so it was not under the jurisdiction of the Central Meteorological Observatory. The Ministry of Agriculture and Commerce was, of course, the Ministry of Agriculture and Commerce of the Japanese government, which was not yet divided into the Ministry of Agriculture, Forestry and Fisheries and the Ministry of Economy, Trade and Industry as it is today. According to Funabashi, Tamura was also commissioned by the Ministry of Agriculture and Commerce to devise "new instruments" related to fisheries and to build facilities in the Seto Inland Sea. This overlaps with the "design project" mentioned in Okada's obituary.

== Tamura's premature death and his family ==
Tamura died of illness at 32 years old. According to the obituary by Funabashi, he became ill on July 12, 1909 (Meiji 42), and was diagnosed with intestinal typhoid on July 17. He was then hospitalized at the Tokyo Hospital (now the Jikei University School of Medicine Hospital, which was established by Takaki Kanehiro) and died at 5 p.m. on August 19. His funeral was held at Aoyama Methodist Church in Aoyama Gakuin, and he was buried in Aoyama Cemetery, Tokyo. According to the Tokyo Metropolitan Government's Parks Division, although the burial can be confirmed, the current whereabouts are unknown because there were reburials and changes of administrators.

Tamura was survived by his wife "Kurako" or "Kura" (or possibly "Clara"), and two daughters, "Kimi Grace" and "Michiko." His wife attended Aoyama Gakuin Kaigan Jogakko (Coastal Girls' School) but dropped out to go to the United States in 1894 (Meiji 27). It was four years prior to Tamura's travel to America in 1898 (Meiji 31). The following year, his wife returned to the United States with two daughters, but their whereabouts after that are unknown. There is a "Kimi Grace Tamura," the same name as Tamura's eldest daughter, listed among graduates of the 1930 (Showa 5) graduation program of the Pennsylvania Museum and School of Industrial Art (now University of the Arts, Philadelphia) in Philadelphia.

== Major works ==
Tamura used different names: mainly "S. Tetsu Tamura," sometimes "S.T. Tamura," "Tetsu Tamura or 田村哲," and possibly "Satoru Tetsu Tamura."

- A Young Japanese Convert [alias Satoru Tamura]: [A Novel] Kwaiku (Recollections of the Past). Oelwein, Iowa: Press of the Oelwein Journal, 1898 (24 pages).
- Tamura, S. Tetsu: "Mathematical theory of ice formation." Monthly Weather Review, 1905–02. 33(2):55-59.
- Tamura, S. Tetsu: Mathematical Theory of the Nocturnal Cooling of the Atmosphere, Parts I and II. Ph.D. dissertation (Columbia University 1905, 31 pages). This was reprinted for the degree requirements from the Monthly Weather Review, 1905–04. 33(4):138-147.
- Tamura, S. Tetsu: "An account of recent meteorological and geo-physical researches in Japan." Monthly Weather Review, 1905–07. 33(7):302-305.
- Tamura, S.T.: "Japanese meteorological servise in Korea and Japan." Science (American Association for the Advancement of Science), 1906-03-09. 23(584):396-397.
- Tamura, S. Tetsu: "A memoir of Professor Diro Kitao." Journal of the meteorological Society of Japan, Ser. I, 1907-09-28. 26(9):en.1-en.10. ISSN 0026-1165.
- Tamura, S.T.: "Appeal for an aero-physical observatory in Japan." Science (American Association for the Advancement of Science), 1906-08-03. 24(605):148-150.
- Tamura, S. Tetsu: "A biographical sketch of Prof. Diro Kitao." Monthly Weather Review, 1907–10. 35(10):452-454.
- 田村 哲:「米国における気象学の進歩」『地学雑誌』1907. 19(6):392-395. ISSN 0022-135X. /Meteorological progress in the United States/
- 田村 哲(述): 『近世科学』（高等国民教育）. [東京]: 早稲田大学出版部, [1908]. /Modern Science (Lecture note)/
- 田村 哲:『外遊九年』. 東京: 目黒書店, 1908. /Nine Years Abroad: An Autobiography/

== See also ==
- Meteorology
- Oceanography
- Kiyoshi Kawakami
- Emma Kate Corkhill
- G. Stanley Hall
- Robert Simpson Woodward
- Cleveland Abbe
- Syukuro Manabe
- List of meteorologists
