= Emma Kate Corkhill =

Early female professor of English Literature

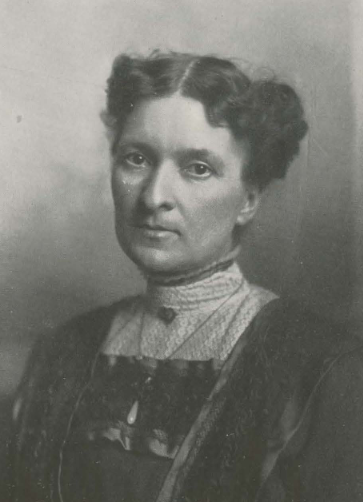
- In her forties (ca. 1908)
- Born: 1866
- Died: December 13, 1913 (aged 46–47); Chicago, Illinois, U.S.
- Occupation(s): academic and professor in English Literature
- Known for: an early female professor with Ph.D. at co-ed universities
- Notable work: Shakespearean literature

Emma Kate Corkhill (1866–December 13, 1913) was an early female professor of coeducational universities with a Ph.D. degree in the United States and an academic in English Literature.

== Early life ==
Emma Kate Corkhill was born in 1866 and grew up in the Southern Iowa with her family.

She attended the Iowa Wesleyan University in Mount Pleasant, Iowa, graduating from the university with B.A. in 1889 and M.A. in 1892. (Iowa Wesleyan conferred Master's degrees on graduates five years after graduation, with no formal Master's programs). While at Iowa Wesleyan, she became a member of Pi Beta Phi. Soon after the graduation from the Iowa Wesleyan University, she went up to Boston, Massachusetts, and earned the degree of Ph.D. from Boston University in 1893.

== Research and teaching ==
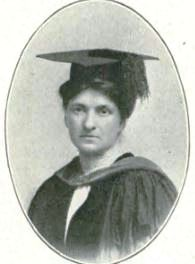
Emma Kate Corkhill, Ph.D. (Boston University in 1893)

=== Boston University and University of Edinburgh ===
The title of Emma Kate Corkhill's doctoral dissertation was The Growth of Shakespeare's Mind and Art, which was submitted in partial fulfillment of requirements for the degree of Doctor of Philosophy in the Boston University Graduate School in 1893. After the completion of doctoral degree, she spent one year (1905-1906) at the University of Edinburgh in Scotland, for the special study of English Literature.

=== Iowa Wesleyan University and Simpson College ===
At first, she taught a short time at her alma mater, Iowa Wesleyan University, and then at Simpson College in Indianola, Iowa, for seven years (1896ー1902) as a professor. In 1898, during the summer, she helped a Japanese student named S. Tetsu Tamura, who later became a meteorologist, for his novel composition entitled Kwaiku: Recollections of the Past published in this year.

=== Lawrence College (University) ===
In 1902, she moved to Appleton, Wisconsin, to become the chair (Edwards Alexander Professor) of English Literature at Lawrence College, now Lawrence University and stayed until her death in 1913.

== Later life ==
According to the alumni record of the Lawrence University, during the summer in 1911, Professor Corkhill was sick and given leave of absence for the first semester of the following academic year. Fortunately, she could teach again from February of the following year 1912 to fall of 1913. But she was advised by the doctor to be hospitalized on December 11, 1913, and died two days later on December 13, 1913.
