= Gerrit Hiemstra =

Dutch meteorologist and weather presenter

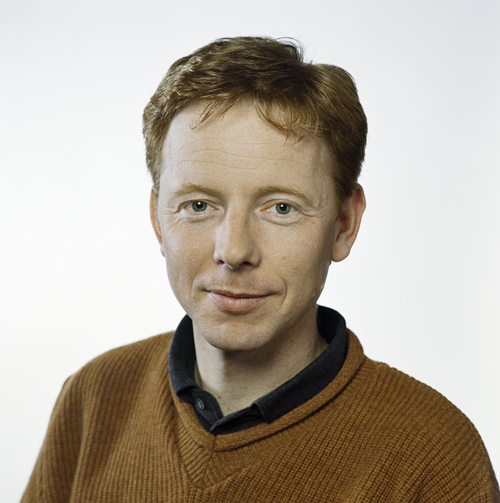
- Gerrit Hiemstra (2000)
- Born: Gerrit Hiemstra; 19 August 1961 (age 65); Drachten, Netherlands
- Education: Wageningen University & Research
- Occupations: Meteorologist weather presenter
- Years active: 1986–present
- Known for: NOS Journaal, NPO Radio 1
- Website: www.weatherimpact.nl

Gerrit Hiemstra (born 19 August 1961) is a Dutch meteorologist and weather presenter. From 1998 until 2023 he was one of the weather presenters for the Dutch public news broadcaster NOS Journaal.

== Awards ==
In 2021 Hiemstra received the Machiavelli award, a Dutch prize awarded annually to politicians or organisations for outstanding achievement in the field of public communication.

== See also ==
- List of meteorologists
