= Sparky Von Plinsky =

American politician

Member of the New Hampshire House of Representatives from the Cheshire 7th district
- In office December 5, 2018 – December 7, 2022
- Preceded by: Gladys Johnsen
- Succeeded by: Shaun Filiault

Personal details
- Born: July 11, 1977 (age 49) Charlotte, North Carolina, U.S.
- Party: Democratic
- Spouse: Brenda
- Children: Abigail; Meghan
- Education: University of Massachusetts; Brenau University

Military service
- Allegiance: United States Army

Alexander H. "Sparky" Von Plinsky IV (born July 11, 1977) is a New Hampshire politician.

== Education ==
Von Plinsky earned a master's degree in landscape architecture from the University of Massachusetts and a bachelor's degree in public administration from Brenau University.

== Military career ==
Von Plinsky has served in the United States Army.

== Political career ==
On November 6, 2018, Von Plinsky was elected to the New Hampshire House of Representatives where he represents the Cheshire 7 district. Von Plinsky assumed office on December 5, 2018. Von Plinsky is a Democrat. Von Plinsky endorsed Bernie Sanders in the 2020 Democratic Party presidential primaries.

== Personal life ==
Von Plinsky resides in Keene, New Hampshire. Von Plinsky is married to Brenda and has two children.
