= Ski Museum of Maine =

Museum in Maine, United States

Maine Ski and Snowboard Museum and Hall of Fame
- Abbreviation: MSSM
- Formation: 1995
- Type: Nonprofit Educational Organization
- Purpose: celebrate, preserve, and share the history and heritage of Maine skiing and snowboarding
- Location: Carrabassett Valley, Maine
- Website: maineskiandsnowboardmuseum.org
- Formerly called: Ski Museum of Maine

The Maine Ski and Snowboard Museum in Carrabassett Valley, Maine, United States, is devoted to preserving and presenting the history and heritage of skiing and snowboarding in Maine.

== History ==
The museum began informally in 1995 with the efforts of several members of the Sugarloaf Ski Club, and was incorporated in 1999. Several thousand Sugarloaf Ski Club documents formed the original nucleus of the archives, augmented with additional donations from Walter Melvin documenting the Bangor area from the 1930s through the 1960s, items borrowed from the personal collection of Glenn Parkinson (member of the museum's board of directors), acquisition of a set of miniature skis crafted circa 1905 in Portland, Maine by Theo A. Johnsen and used by him as a marketing tool for his Tajco brand, and further donations.

Originally located in Farmington, the museum in 2009 relocated to downtown Kingfield, then in 2022 to its current location on the Sugarloaf Access Road, Carrabassett Valley (old Condo Check-in building).

== Exhibits ==
The museum collection includes approximately three dozen pairs of Maine-made skis that date from the early 20th century, numerous examples of leather ski boots and a variety of accessories.

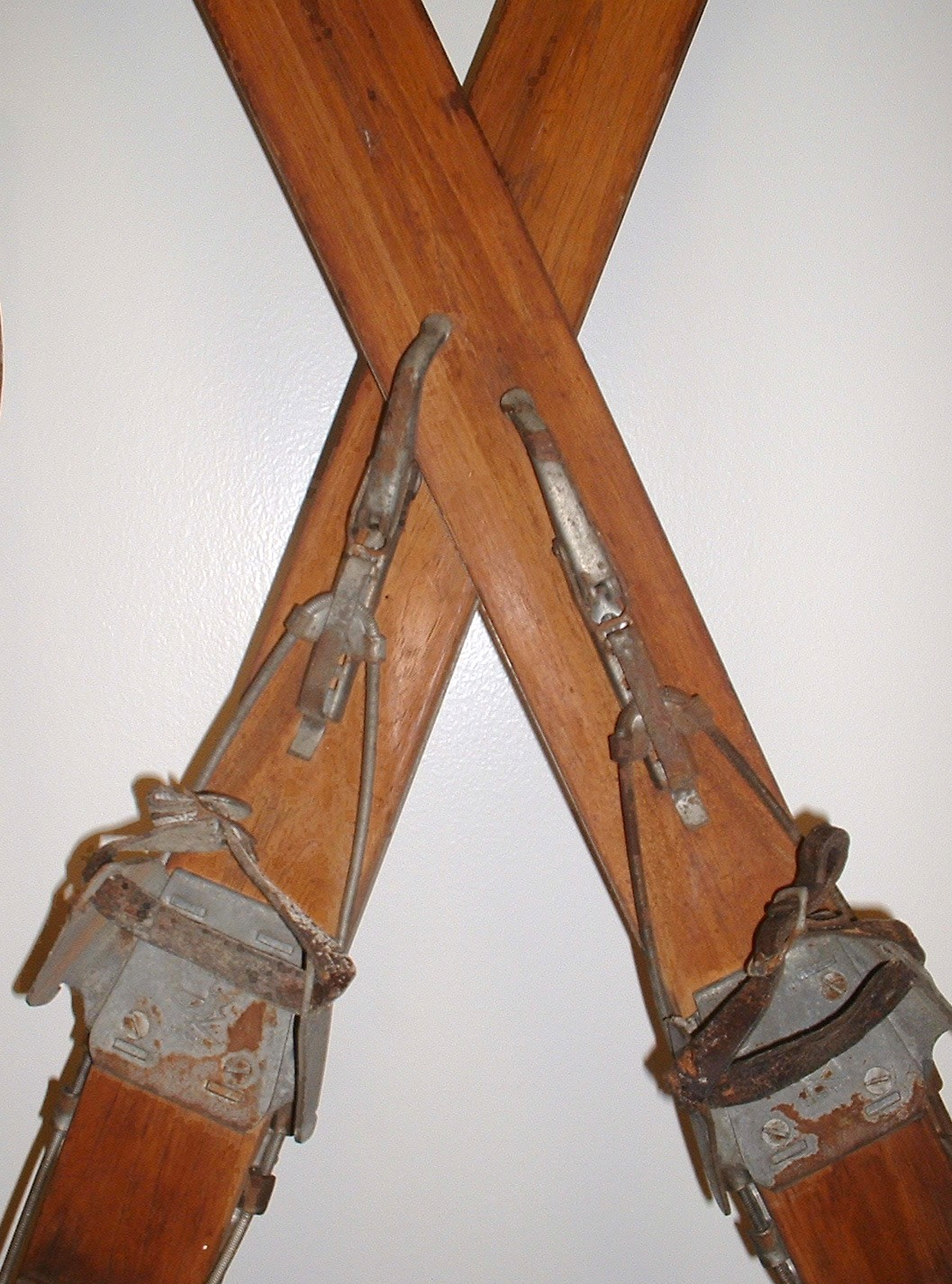
Skis made in Paris, Maine, by Paris Manufacturing Company. In the early 20th century, Maine was an important manufacturer of wooden skis. Scott Andrews photo

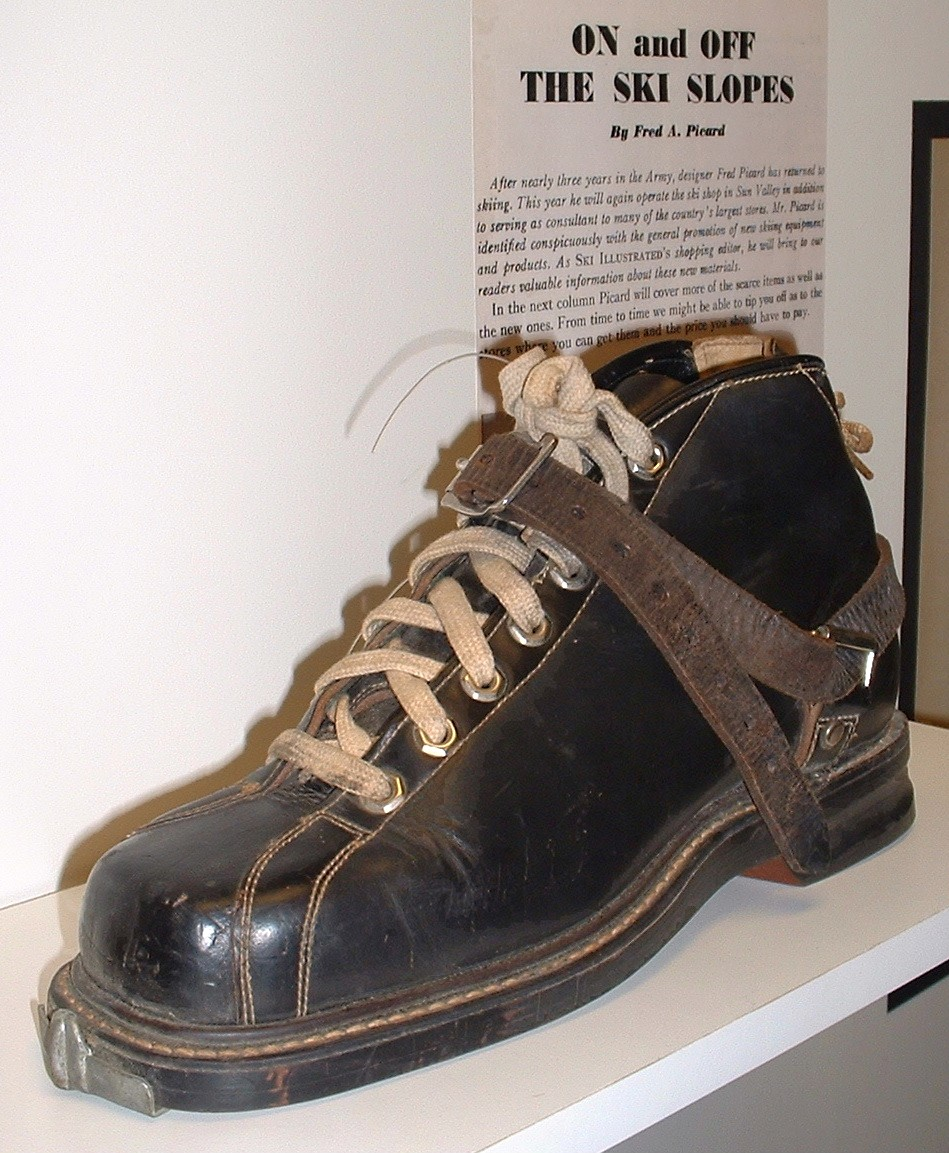
Ski boot made in Wilton, Maine, by G.H. Bass Company, circa 1940s. In the era of leather lace-up ski boots, G.H. Bass was an industry leader. Scott Andrews photo

Other museum activities include an online archive of vintage photographs, published in cooperation with the Maine Memory Network, a website of the Maine Historical Society.

During the 2008–2009 ski season, the museum inaugurated a series of "Fireside Chats," narrated digital slideshows that depict the history and heritage of Maine skiing from 1870 to the present.

=== Maine Ski and Snowboard Hall of Fame ===
The museum includes the Maine Ski and Snowboard Hall of Fame, which honors Mainers who have made substantial contributions to the sport, both statewide and nationally.
