= Jan Pelleboer =

Dutch television meteorologist

- Born: 2 May 1924 's-Heerenbroek, Netherlands
- Died: 18 July 1992 (aged 68); Paterswolde, Netherlands
- Occupations: Meteorologist, weather presenter
- Years active: 1954–1992
- Known for: Weather presentation

Jan Hendrik Pelleboer (2 May 1924 – 18 July 1992) was a Dutch meteorologist and weather presenter best known for his entertaining style of presentation and who is credited for popularizing (amateur) meteorology among the Dutch public. He was, in fact, the first "weatherman" in Dutch broadcasting.

== See also ==
- List of meteorologists
