= 's-Heerenbroek =

- Village
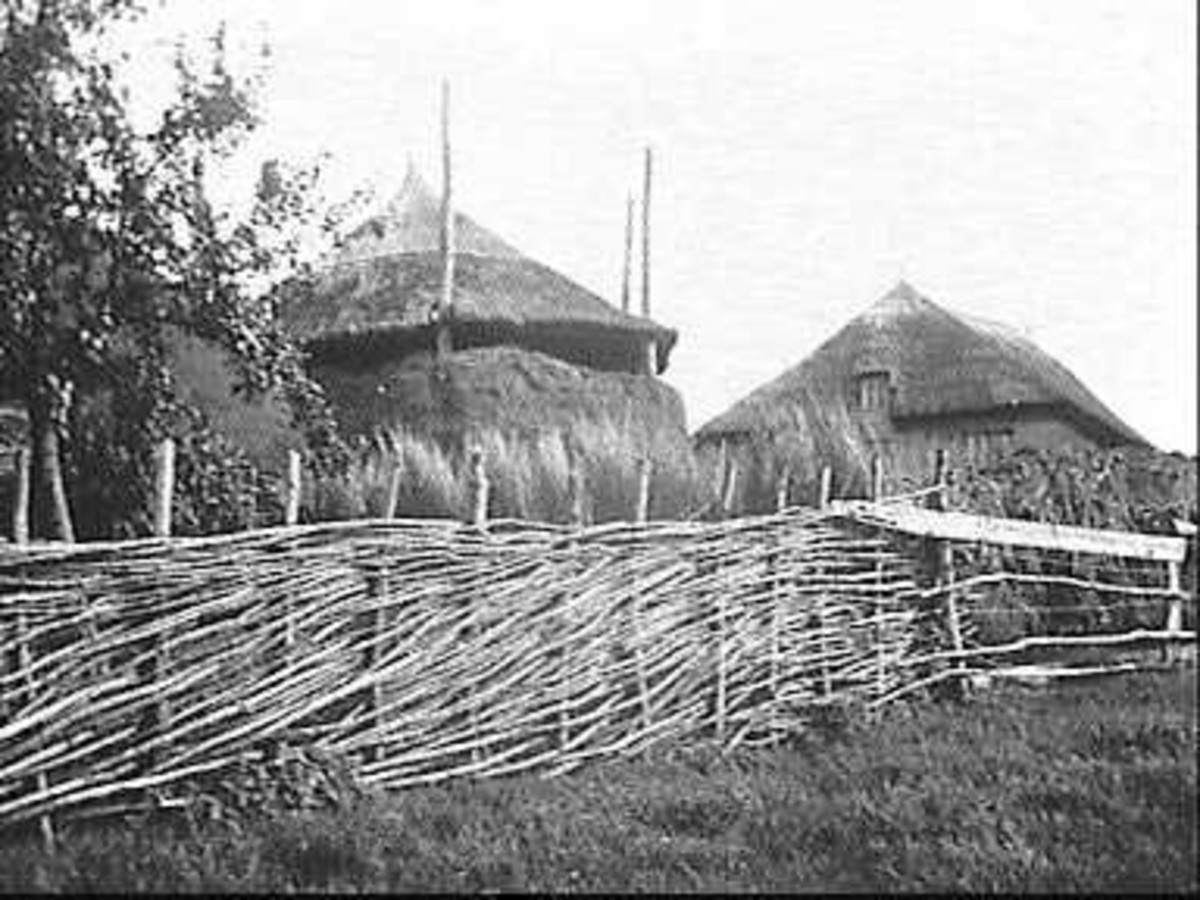
- View on 's-Heerenbroek

- Location in the Netherlands 's-Heerenbroek (Netherlands)
- Coordinates: 52°32′21″N 6°0′45″E
- Country: Netherlands
- Province: Overijssel
- Municipality: Kampen

Area
  - Total: 3.94 km^{2} (1.52 sq mi)
- Elevation: 1 m (3.3 ft)

Population (2021)
  - Total: 670
  - Density: 170/km^{2} (440/sq mi)
- Time zone: UTC+1 (CET)
  - Summer (DST): UTC+2 (CEST)
- Postal code: 8275
- Dialing code: 0546

's-Heerenbroek is a village in the Dutch province of Overijssel. It is located in the municipality of Kampen, about 5 km west of Zwolle. It has a school, the Prinses Julianaschool, which was founded in 1909. There was formerly a milk factory which was well known in the municipality of Kampen.

It was first mentioned in 1364 as "myns Heren brueck", and means "the swamp of the Lord". The Lord is a reference to the Prince-Bishop of Utrecht. In 1840, it was home to 161 people. Since 2010, it is home to museum De Kroon, the smallest museum in Overijssel which is located in the shed of former inn De Kroon.

== Notable people ==
- Jan Pelleboer (1924–1992), meteorologist and weather presenter
