= Jonsen =

Jonsen is a patronymic surname meaning "son of Jon". Notable people with the surname include:

- Albert R. Jonsen (1931–2020), biomedical ethicist and author
- Hans Olav Jonsen aka (Sola), Norwegian musician in the band DumDum Boys
- Rane Jonsen
- Travis Jonsen (born 1996), American football player

== See also ==
- Johnsen
