= KXAS-TV =

Television station in Fort Worth, Texas

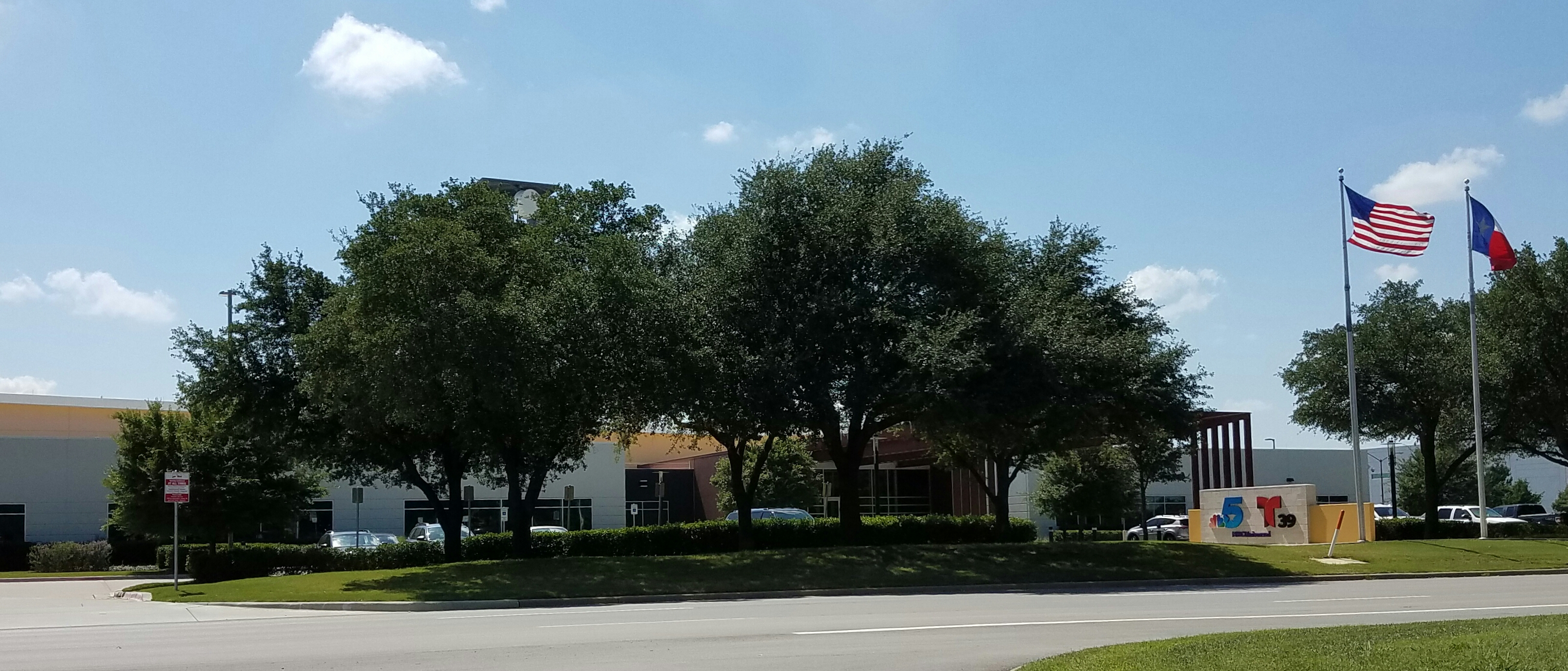
- The KXAS–KXTX offices in Fort Worth south of DFW
- Fort Worth–Dallas, Texas; United States
- City: Fort Worth, Texas
- Channels: Digital: 24 (UHF); Virtual: 5
- Branding: NBC 5

Programming
- Affiliations: 5.1: NBC; for others, see § Subchannels

Ownership
- Owner: NBC Owned Television Stations; (Station Venture Operations, LP)
- Sister stations: KXTX-TV

History
- First air date: September 29, 1948
- Former call signs: WBAP-TV (1948–1974)
- Former channel numbers: Analog: 5 (VHF, 1948–2009); Digital: 41 (UHF, 1998–2018)
- Former affiliations: ABC (secondary, 1948–1957)
- Call sign meaning: Texas

Technical information
- Licensing authority: FCC
- Facility ID: 49330
- ERP: 925 kW
- HAAT: 496 m (1,627 ft)
- Transmitter coordinates: 32°35′7″N 96°58′6″W

Links
- Public license information: Public file; LMS
- Website: www.nbcdfw.com

KXAS-TV (channel 5) is a television station licensed to Fort Worth, Texas, United States, serving the Dallas–Fort Worth metroplex. It is owned and operated by the NBC television network through its NBC Owned Television Stations division. Under common ownership with Telemundo outlet KXTX-TV (channel 39), the two stations share studios at the CentrePort Business Park in eastern Fort Worth; KXAS-TV's transmitter is located in Cedar Hill, Texas.

== History ==
=== Early history under Carter Publications ===
Amon G. Carter Sr.—the founding publisher of the Fort Worth Star-Telegram—first submitted an application to the Federal Communications Commission (FCC) for a license to build and operate a television station on VHF channel 5 in Fort Worth in late October 1944, mere days after Karl Hoblitzelle, owner of Interstate Circuit Theatres, filed an application to operate a station on channel 8 on October 23, the first such license application for a television station in the Southern United States. When the FCC awarded the construction permit for Channel 5 to Carter on June 21, 1946, he originally requested to assign KCPN (for "Carter Publications News") as the station's call sign; three months before it signed on, however, Carter chose instead to assign the television station the calls that were used by the radio station that he also owned, WBAP (820 AM).

The station began test broadcasts on September 15, 1948, which was received from 5 cities. Channel 5 informally signed on the air as WBAP-TV on September 27, to broadcast coverage of President Harry S. Truman's re-election campaign speech at the Texas & Pacific terminal building in downtown Fort Worth. WBAP-TV officially commenced regular programming two days later on September 29, 1948, with two 10-minute specials at 7 p.m. that evening, respectively featuring speeches from Carter and general manager Harold Hough and a film from NBC dedicating the station's launch. Carter owned the television and radio properties through the Star-Telegram's corporate parent, Carter Publications. It was the first television station to sign on in the state of Texas; the second to be located between Los Angeles, St. Louis and Richmond, Virginia (after KDYL-TV in Salt Lake City); and the 25th to sign on in the United States.

When the station made its formal debut, its first night of regular broadcasts did not go smoothly. On the date of its sign-on, the station's studio facilities were in the latter stages of construction; at one point, Amon Carter accidentally stepped into an unmarked hole in the studio floor that led to the building's basement, narrowly saved from enduring potential injury by Star-Telegram cartoonist Johnny Hay. A power outage near the transmitter facility also knocked WBAP-TV off the air for 17 minutes around 8 pm. Angry viewers subsequently called into the station, blaming engineers for an outage that was beyond their control; after the power problems were fixed, another viewer calling into the station complained to a receptionist about not being able to receive WBAP-TV's signal, not realizing that the television station could not be picked up through their radio receiver. Even still, Fort Worth Press reporter Jack Gordon wrote regarding the station's first night of programming that "part of Fort Worth's inaugural television show [...] looked like our first roll of home movie film. But a good deal more of it was excellent – enough so to convince the stubbornest critic that television is here to stay."

KXAS studios and offices (as well as those of co-owned KXTX-TV, and for a time those of radio stations WBAP (AM) and KSCS-FM) were located in this building east of downtown Fort Worth on Barnett Street.

Channel 5 originally operated from studio facilities located at 3900 Barnett Street in eastern Fort Worth. The building—located in an area known as Broadcast Hill—was the first studio facility in the United States that was designed specifically for television broadcasting; the 400-foot (120 m) tower that transmitted its signal (supporting microwave and remote antennas) was also based on the studio grounds. The station originally broadcast for four hours each evening on Wednesday through Saturdays, with test patterns airing during the late morning and late afternoon Monday through Saturdays; the station expanded its programming schedule to all seven days each week within six months, airing a cumulative total of between 35 and 40 hours of programming per week.

Originally serving as an affiliate, Channel 5 has carried programming from NBC since its sign-on—having inherited the affiliation through WBAP radio's longtime relationship with the television network's radio predecessor, the NBC Blue Network, with which it had been affiliated since 1927; however, it also maintained a secondary affiliation with ABC by way of a secondary affiliation that WBAP radio had begun maintaining with the ABC Radio Network, the direct successor to NBC Blue, when it and timeshare partner WFAA assumed the 570 AM frequency (taking over the former KGKO) on an alternating basis in April 1947. The following year in 1949, WBAP-TV and WBAP (AM), were joined by an FM sister station, WBAP-FM (96.3 FM, now KSCS). The WBAP calls reportedly stood for "We Bring a Program"; the call sign and their associated meaning were suggested by Herbert Hoover during his tenure as chairman of what was then the Federal Radio Commission prior to the radio station's sign-on in 1922; in reality, they were sequentially assigned with no meaning. Among the local programs that aired on Channel 5 in its early years included the Saturday night country music/dance program Barn Dance, music series Bobby Peters Jamboree and the children's programs See-Saw Zoo and Kitty's Playhouse.

When Channel 5 signed on, it was apparent that Dallas and Fort Worth were going to be collapsed into a single television market due to the close proximity of the two cities; despite the fact that Dallas and Tarrant counties bordered one another, Arbitron had initially designated their respective county seats as separate markets (the counties that surrounded Tarrant County on the western half of the Metroplex were part of the Fort Worth market, while those surrounding Dallas County in the eastern half of the metropolitan region were part of the Dallas market). However, Carter, who had long been a booster for the Fort Worth area, did not care whether Dallas residents could view Channel 5's broadcast signal, which provided rimshot coverage within most of central and eastern Dallas County, including Dallas proper. As a result, in 1950, NBC reached an agreement with A. H. Belo Corporation to switch the primary affiliation of DuMont affiliate WFAA-TV (channel 8) to NBC to serve as its affiliate for the eastern half of the market.

On July 1, 1952, WBAP-TV became among the first six television stations in the country (along with fellow NBC stations KPRC-TV in Houston, WOAI-TV in San Antonio, WKY-TV in Oklahoma City, KOTV in Tulsa and WDSU-TV in New Orleans) to begin transmitting network programming over a live microwave feed, inaugurated with a message by Today Show host Dave Garroway welcoming the stations in commencing live network telecasts. That decade, Channel 5 also became one of the first television stations to convert its local programming to color; the station's conversion to color broadcasts on May 15, 1954, was preceded by a dedication of its new production and master control facilities—which were upgraded specifically for color telecasting—from Carter and David Sarnoff, chairman of then-NBC parent RCA, that was broadcast on the station; this was followed by a three-hour block of programs produced in color, the longest broadcast of such programs ever attempted by a television station at that time. By 1955, WBAP-TV—which had earlier ordered RCA color television equipment in the fall of 1949, and became the first television station in Texas to broadcast NBC programs in color on April 9, 1954—had greatly increased the number of programs that it broadcast in color, televising the largest amount of programming produced in the format of any U.S. television station at the time.

Ownership of Star-Telegram and the WBAP stations would transfer to Amon Carter Sr.'s heirs after he succumbed from the last of several heart attacks he had suffered over the previous two years on June 23, 1955. Meanwhile, NBC grew frustrated with having to maintain affiliations with two stations to carry its programming in an otherwise effectively consolidated market. In early 1957, a taller transmission tower was built at the west end of the Broadcast Hill studio property. However, NBC threatened to strip its affiliation from Channel 5 if it did not relocate its transmitter farther eastward to extend the station's signal deeper into the Dallas metropolitan area; reportedly, the network approached the owners of Fort Worth's other station, independent KFJZ-TV (channel 11, now KTVT), which had in 1962 moved its transmitter to the antenna farm in Cedar Hill. Belo also made an attempt to make WFAA-TV the market's exclusive NBC affiliate. To prevent the network from defecting, Carter's heirs—who were reluctant to comply to NBC's demands at first, out of their desire to continue Amon Carter Sr.'s legacy of pro-Fort Worth civic boosterism—agreed to move WBAP-TV's transmitter facilities to Cedar Hill and boost its effective radiated power to adequately cover Dallas; in the summer of 1964, it installed a transmitter at the Hill Tower (owned by the Dallas Newspapers) to feed the channel 5 antenna on a 1,500-foot (460 m) candelabra tower that was already shared by WFAA-TV and KRLD-TV (channel 4, now KDFW-TV); sister station WBAP-FM also moved its transmitter to this location. The move to Cedar Hill allowed channel 5 to become the sole NBC affiliate for the entire Dallas–Fort Worth market on September 1, 1957, and subsequently, WFAA-TV became the area's exclusive ABC station. In October 1959, WBAP-TV installed the first color videotape recorder in Texas, allowing it the ability to record a 90-minute segment of programming and replay it in less than five minutes.

As WBAP-TV, versions of this channel 5 logo were used in some part of the 1960s for certain station IDs.

During NBC's coverage of the assassination of President John F. Kennedy on November 22, 1963, WBAP-TV transmitted news reports conducted from its Broadcast Hill studios on the sniper-range shooting at the Presidential motorcade carrying Kennedy and Governor John Connally (who himself was injured in the shooting) in color; NBC broadcast the station's color feed during its coverage, which was otherwise transmitted in black and white from their New York studios. Charles Murphy, who served as an anchor at the station, relayed word of Kennedy's death during emergency surgery at Parkland Hospital that afternoon. Two days later on November 24, a remote unit that was loaned to WBAP-TV by KTVT management and set up at the Dallas Police Department's downtown headquarters, awaiting the transfer of suspect Lee Harvey Oswald (who shot both men from an upper-floor window at the Texas School Book Depository overlooking Elm Street) to the Dallas County Jail, fed live images of the accused Presidential assassin being gunned down by nightclub owner Jack Ruby to the NBC network; it marked the first time that a murder had been witnessed live on U.S. network television. The station's coverage of the Kennedy assassination and his visit to Texas during which it occurred earned WBAP-TV a national Sigma Delta Chi television news award and a bronze medallion, and honors by the Dallas Press Club and the Radio-Television News Directors Association (RTNDA) in 1964.

=== LIN Broadcasting ownership ===
KXAS-TV's stylized "Star 5" logo has been used in some form since 1971 when the station was still WBAP-TV (it was originally displayed upright until 1999, and accompanied by a background based on the Texas flag from 1992 to 2012). This image, from 1978, is accompanied by NBC's 1976 trapezoid "N" logo.

KXAS logo, used from 1998 to 2012.

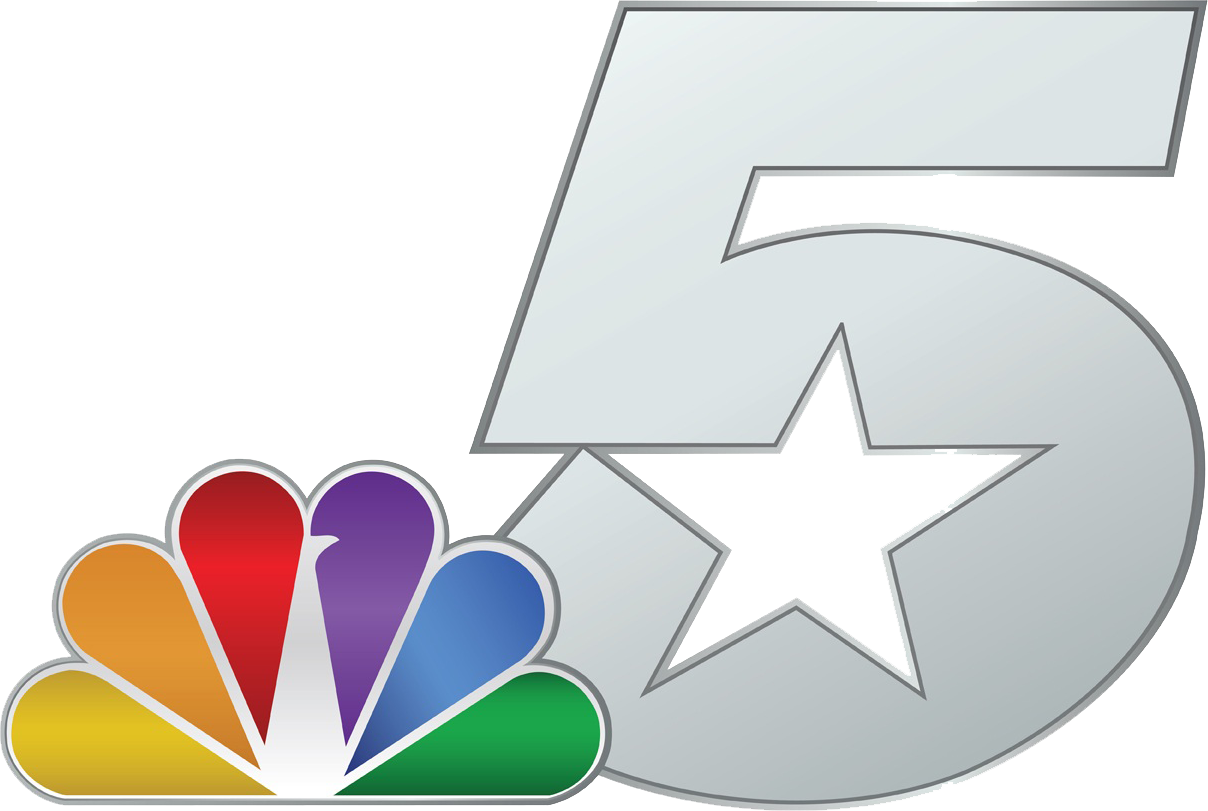
Former KXAS logo, used from 2012 to 2014.

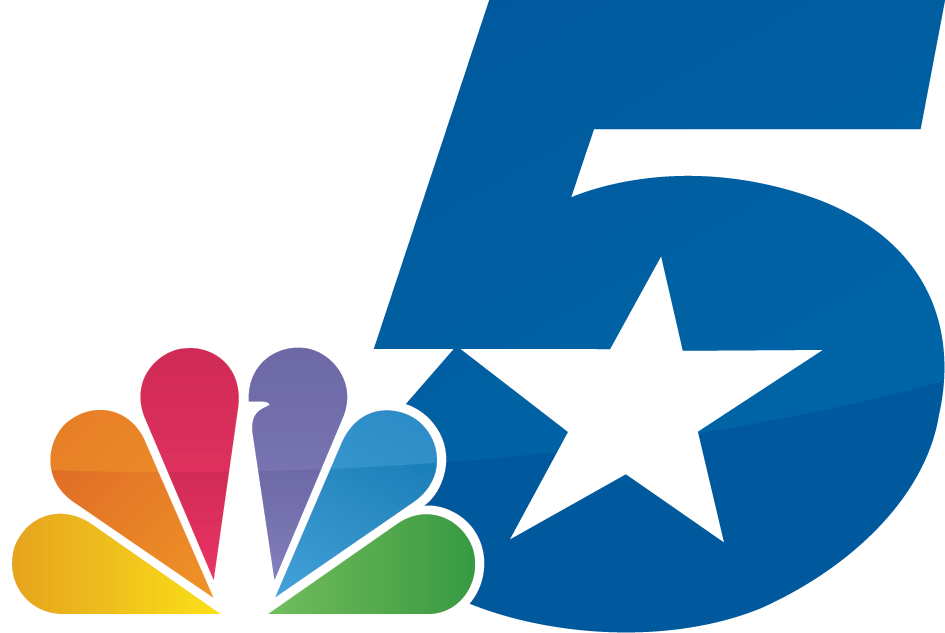
Alternate KXAS logo, used from 2014 to 2015.

Channel 5 remained under the ownership of trusts held by the Carter family until 1974 when the FCC passed a measure prohibiting the common ownership of newspapers and broadcast outlets in the same market. Among the combinations that were granted grandfathered protection by the agency were A.H. Belo's combination of The Dallas Morning News and WFAA-AM-FM-TV; and the Times Mirror Company's combination of KDFW-TV and the Dallas Times Herald. The Commission, however, declined the same for the Star-Telegram, WBAP-AM-TV, and KSCS (the former WBAP-FM), leaving the Carters with little choice but to break up their media empire. In January 1973, Carter Publications announced it would sell WBAP-TV to LIN Broadcasting for $35 million; the Star-Telegram, WBAP and KSCS, meanwhile, were sold to Capital Cities Communications. The sales were finalized in early May 1974; due to FCC rules in place then that prohibited separately owned broadcast properties based in the same market from using the same callsign, channel 5's call letters were subsequently changed to the current KXAS-TV on May 16 of that year.

In 1985, KXAS became the first television station in the Dallas–Fort Worth market to broadcast programming in stereo, when NBC began transmission in the format. On January 14, 1987, the broadcast tower at the station's transmitter in Cedar Hill was struck by a Navy F-4 Phantom that was performing training exercises as it was on approach to the Dallas Naval Air Station, clipping several guy-wires; KXAS, WFAA, and KDFW were all briefly knocked off the air for a few seconds immediately following the incident. The jet's two occupants survived as they had ejected themselves from the aircraft and parachuted to the ground before it crashed. KXAS improvised auxiliary transmission facilities at the nearby tower belonging to KXTX-TV (channel 39)—a tower that itself would collapse while undergoing maintenance in October 1996. Rather than continue sharing transmitter facilities shared with KDFW and WFAA (which co-owned the tower site), station management opted to build a new 1,400-foot (427 m)-tall facility to house its transmitter (the first such broadcast transmitter in Texas to use the improved circular, polarized dish to transmit its signal) a 1/4 mile (0.40 km) to the east of the old tower, on acres of land that had been owned by the station since the 1960s; the tower, which also houses transmitters for former sister radio stations KSCS and KBFB, was completed in 1989.

In 1993, LIN Broadcasting assumed operational responsibilities for independent station KXTX-TV through a local marketing agreement with the station's owner at the time, the Christian Broadcasting Network (CBN). Through the consolidation of that station's operations with Channel 5, KXTX began airing rebroadcasts of its 6 and 10 p.m. newscasts each weeknight as well as select first-run syndicated programs seen on KXAS.

On May 23, 1994, in an overall deal in which News Corporation also acquired a 20% equity interest in the company, New World Communications signed a long-term affiliation agreement with Fox, as part of the network's strategy to strengthen its affiliate portfolio (then composed mostly of UHF outlets with limited to no prior history as major network affiliates) after the National Football League (NFL) awarded it the television rights to the National Football Conference (NFC), a four-year contract that began with the 1994 NFL season, on December 18, 1993. One of the twelve television stations affiliated with either CBS, ABC or NBC that were involved in the deal was KDFW, which had been affiliated with CBS since it signed on in December 1949 and—along with CBS affiliate KTBC in Austin and ABC affiliate KTVI in St. Louis—was added to the agreement as a byproduct of New World's $717 million purchase of four stations owned by Argyle Television Holdings on May 26. With thirteen months left until CBS's contract with KDFW—which, as a result of the agreement with New World, would replace existing owned-and-operated station KDAF (channel 33) as the market's Fox station, resulting in Fox Television Stations selling KDAF to Renaissance Broadcasting—was set to expire on July 1, 1995, KXAS was the first station that the network had approached to become its new Dallas-Fort Worth affiliate. LIN Broadcasting turned down the offer, in favor of signing a long-term deal that renewed its affiliation agreements with KXAS and NBC-affiliated sisters KXAN-TV in Austin, WAVY-TV in Norfolk and WOOD-TV in Grand Rapids; however as WFAA was already under contract with ABC through a multi-station agreement with Belo, this later prompted CBS to sign a deal with KTVT through an agreement it signed with Gaylord Broadcasting on September 14, 1994, in exchange for also switching its sister independent station in Tacoma, Washington, KSTW, to the network. To this day, KXAS-TV remains the only station in the market to never change its primary affiliation.

In June of that year, following the $12.6-billion acquisition of majority owner McCaw Cellular Communications (which acquired a 52% interest in LIN in 1990 for $3.4 billion) by the AT&T Corporation in 1994, LIN Broadcasting announced that it would spin off seven of its eight television stations (including KXAS-TV) into a separate publicly traded corporate entity, the LIN Television Corporation. The following year in 1995, KXAS became the first commercial television station in Texas to launch a website, which provided news reports and information on the station's community initiatives and on-air staff members; the station expanded its Internet offerings in 1997, when it became the first television station in the Southwestern United States to deliver news alerts via e-mail.

In 1997, KXAS became the first television station in the Dallas–Fort Worth market to commit to launching a digital television signal; the station aired its first high-definition telecast on March 31 of that year, when it aired a Major League Baseball game between the Texas Rangers and the Chicago White Sox. Regular digital television transmissions commenced on November 1, 1998, when KXAS began full-time operation of its digital signal on UHF channel 41.

=== NBC ownership ===
On October 23, 1997, LIN Television was acquired by Hicks, Muse, Tate & Furst for $1.9 billion. In conjunction with the Dallas-based investment firm's submitted bid for the company on September 12, LIN contributed KXAS-TV to a joint venture with NBC, in which the former sold a 76% majority equity interest in the station to NBC, which in turn would contribute a 24% share of San Diego owned-and-operated station KNSD to Hicks Muse, predicated on the firm acquiring and closing on its deal with LIN. The takeover and joint venture deals were completed on March 2, 1998, when NBC and LIN formally established Station Venture Holdings, LP to serve as the licensee of KXAS and KNSD.

As it held 79.62% controlling equity in the partnership, NBC assumed control of KXAS' operations by way of its NBC Television Stations subsidiary, which continued to control KNSD through its continued majority ownership of that station. Although not a traditional arrangement, NBC's assumption of majority control over KXAS made it a de facto owned-and-operated station; however as a consequence, the purchase of majority interest in Channel 5 resulted in the termination of its LMA with KXTX. In May 1998, the station changed its on-air branding to "NBC 5" and its newscast branding to NBC 5 Texas News (adapted from its 1989-1997 Texas News 5 branding, and later simplified to NBC 5 News in November 1999) in compliance with the branding conventions that the network had adopted for its O&Os.

On October 11, 2001, NBC purchased the Telemundo Communications Group from a consortium of Sony Pictures Entertainment, Liberty Media, and private equity firms BV Capital, Bastion Capital and Council Tree Communications for $1.98 billion (increasing to $2.68 billion prior to the sale's closure) and the assumption of $700 million in debt. The acquisition included rights to an existing purchase agreement for KXTX, which Telemundo had bought from Southwest Sports Television for $65 million on June 27. The integration of the Telemundo O&Os into NBC Television Stations caused KXTX and KXAS to become sister stations for the second time, although now under joint ownership as the third television station duopoly in the Dallas–Fort Worth market (after CBS-owned KTVT and KTXA (channel 21), and Univision-owned KUVN (channel 23) and KSTR-TV (channel 49)). As a byproduct of the purchase, NBC converted KXTX—which subsequently integrated its operations into KXAS's Broadcast Hill facilities—into a Telemundo owned-and-operated station on January 1, 2002, taking over the local affiliation rights from KFWD (channel 52), which had been affiliated with the network since its sign-on in September 1988.

KXAS-TV launched a digital subchannel on virtual channel 5.2 in February 2005, which originally served as a charter affiliate of NBC Weather Plus (known as "NBC 5 Weather Plus"), a co-owned 24-hour weather-focused network featuring a mix of local and national current weather observations and forecasts as well as pre-recorded local weather updates conducted by the station's meteorologists. On December 23, 2008, three weeks after the network ceased operations on December 1, the subchannel was reformatted as part of the network's successor service NBC Plus, an automated service featuring local weather information powered using the Weather Plus graphics platform, alongside audio from NOAA Weather Radio station KEC55 in Fort Worth, and alternately from KEC56 in Dallas.

On January 1, 2009, KXAS launched a tertiary subchannel on virtual channel 5.3, which served as a charter over-the-air affiliate of Universal Sports. Universal Sports converted to a cable- and satellite-exclusive service on December 31, 2011, dropping its over-the-air subchannel affiliations and resulting in KXAS removing the 5.3 subchannel from its signal. The station would later re-activate the subchannel as an affiliate of LX in May 2020.

KXAS-TV shut down its analog signal, over VHF channel 5, on June 12, 2009, as part of the federally mandated transition from analog to digital television. The station's digital signal remained on its transition period UHF channel 41, using virtual channel 5. Through its participation as a SAFER Act "nightlight" broadcaster, KXAS kept its analog signal on the air starting with a brief test pattern at noon that day, followed by a loop of public service announcements from the National Association of Broadcasters (NAB) to inform viewers of the digital transition. The analog signal remained in lame-duck operation until June 26.

On November 19, 2009, a fire in the electrical room of the station's Broadcast Hill studios knocked both stations off the air. Fire alarms were activated throughout the facility at 9:30 p.m. that evening, which resulted in staff members being evacuated from the studio; this resulted in the disruption of that evening's scheduled broadcasts of the 10 p.m. newscasts seen respectively on KXAS and KXTX. On February 12, 2013, LIN Media chose to withdraw its interest in the Station Venture Operations joint venture as part of a corporate reorganization. Through the dissolution of the arrangement, NBC gained full ownership of KXAS and regained exclusive ownership in KNSD.

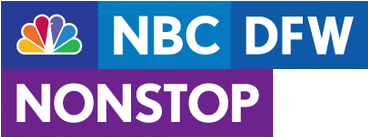
Logo for NBC DFW Nonstop until 2012.

On May 4, 2011, KXAS-DT2 became an affiliate of NBC Nonstop (under the branding "NBC DFW Nonstop"), a programming format exclusive to the subchannels of NBC's O&Os that featured a mix of originally-produced news and lifestyle programming and rebroadcasts of KXAS's newscasts; NBC Nonstop was relaunched as the classic television network Cozi TV on December 20, 2012.

In June 2012, NBCUniversal announced plans to construct a new 75,000-square-foot (6,968 m^{2}) facility in Fort Worth (located at the CentrePort Business Park on the former site of Amon Carter Field) to house KXAS, KXTX and NBCUniversal's other Dallas-based operations (including the Dallas news bureau operated by NBC News). Construction of the facility began that month, and was completed in September 2013, with the building formally opening on September 30. The facility incorporates four production studios; three control rooms that relay high definition content; a combined media asset management center and newsroom production suite for managing and editing content; and an expanded weather center within the production studio housing KXAS' main news set that contains upgraded software systems, an expert desk and two 80-inch (203 cm) touchscreen monitors; the station's traffic and sales departments, which were previously in separate areas of the Broadcast Hill studios, were also placed adjacent to the newsroom. The sales and marketing departments of the television stations, and NBC's ArtWorks graphics firm began migrating their operations to the facility in early October of that year; all other operations—including the news departments of KXAS and KXTX—moved to the Carter Boulevard studio by November 1, ending KXAS's 65-year tenure at Broadcast Hill. Three of the conference rooms at the station are each themed to honor pioneers at Channel 5: one for station founder Amon Carter, one for original chief meteorologist Harold Taft, the other for remaining original station employee and on-air talent, Bobbie Wygant.

On March 14, 2018, it was announced that NBC Owned Television Stations and telecommunications giant T-Mobile US had entered into an agreement to accelerate of relocating their 600 MHz spectrum of the station to its new frequency at the end of May, instead of the original FCC deadline of June 21, 2019; a year ahead of its original deadline. The station reallocated to UHF channel 24 in phase zero of the repack, rather than the originally scheduled phase three of the repack. KXAS-TV was one of nearly 1,000 television stations that changed their digital signal allocation in the spectrum repack that was finished on July 3, 2020. The station completed its move to UHF channel 24 in the morning of May 30, 2018.

== Programming ==
=== Sports programming ===
From 1970 to 1997 (with the AFL–NFL merger), KXAS aired Dallas Cowboys games in which they played host to an AFC opponent at Texas Stadium (two games each year for the station [including their Thanksgiving games in some years]; prior to 1970, all Cowboys games were exclusively broadcast on KDFW [then KRLD-TV]); during this time, they aired five of the Cowboys' Super Bowl appearances (Super Bowls V, XIII, XXVII, XXVIII, and XXX [the latter three were won by the Cowboys]). Since 2006, the station airs Cowboys games when they play on NBC's Sunday Night Football. The station also aired any Dallas Stars games as part of NBC's NHL broadcast contract from 2006 to 2021; this included the team's appearance in the 2020 Stanley Cup Finals. Channel 5 has also aired Texas Rangers games as part of NBC's broadcast contract with Major League Baseball from their arrival in 1972 until 1989, again for the postseason only from 1994 to 2000, and since 2026. The station also carried any Dallas Mavericks games as part of NBC's broadcast contract with the NBA from 1990 to 2002 and since 2025.

=== News operation ===
As of 2023, KXAS broadcast 36 hours, 20 minutes of locally produced newscasts each week (with 5 hours, 34 minutes each weekday; four hours on Saturdays; and 4 1/2 hours on Sundays). In addition, the station also produces the half-hour political discussion program Lone Star Politics, which debuted in 2014 and airs at 8:30 a.m. after its Sunday morning newscast. Before the move to its current studio and offices on Amon Carter Boulevard, KXAS maintained a Dallas news bureau located on McKinnon Street in central Dallas.

==== News department history ====
Channel 5's news department launched with the station on September 29, 1948. Originally titled The Texas News (a title that was used in varied forms for four decades, later as Area Five Texas News from 1974 to 1978 and as Texas News 5 from 1991 to 1998), the program maintained a newsreel format for the news department's first 21 years of operation, continuing long after most television stations had switched to a primarily studio-based production structure for their newscasts. The Texas News was the highest-rated local television program in the United States during the station's early years and earned the first of what would be six RTNDA national awards for "Best Local Newscast" during its first year on the air; however, ratings for the program began to decline in the late 1960s amid competition from Dallas-based KRLD-TV and WFAA, which used a live-on-tape format that mixed filed reports with anchored segments presented in-studio.

The station's news broadcasts—which originally aired only in the evening until the launch of a midday newscast in 1972—began implementing a hosted format in 1967, when Bob Schieffer and Russ Bloxom joined the station as anchors for The Texas News, appearing on camera ahead of and after the newsreel segments. The program officially converted to a live-on-tape broadcast on August 1, 1969. Concurrent with the station's move to The Studios at DFW, KXAS donated its collection of news footage shot for The Texas News from the 1950s through the 1970s to the University of North Texas Libraries in Denton in November 2013; the film reels and accompanying script images were digitized by the university for availability to the public via the library's digital preservation network.

The station has long been well known in the Dallas–Fort Worth market for the longevity of its anchors and reporters, with many having worked at Channel 5 for at least ten years. Among them Roberta "Bobbie" Wygant (the longest-tenured television personality in Texas and the first broadcaster in the Southwestern United States to present theater and movie reviews on television, who joined the station in 1948 as an entertainment reporter and later hosted various local programs, including Entertainment and the Arts and the newsmagazine Inside Area 5), Phil Wygant (who worked as an anchor/reporter from 1948 until he was laid off following LIN Broadcasting's acquisition of the station in 1974), Jack Brown (who served as a reporter from 1958 to 1980), Russ Bloxom (who served a lead news anchor from 1967 to 1979) and Jane McGarry (who served as an anchor and reporter from 1982 until she stepped down in July 2012, following her arrest on a misdemeanor DWI charge).

KXAS is known within the Dallas–Fort Worth market for its weather coverage; it claims to be the first television station to have hired only full-time meteorologists, when it hired American Airlines staff meteorologists Harold Taft, Bob Denney and Walter Porter as hosts of Weather Telefacts, a 15-minute nightly series that debuted on October 31, 1949, as the first televised weather forecast program in the United States, which in addition to providing forecasts, explained to viewers complicated aspects of meteorological concepts.

Taft—the first television meteorologist west of the Mississippi River, who concurrently served as an overnight weathercaster for WBAP (AM), where he was coined as "The World's Greatest Weatherman" by overnight personality Bill Mack—became the most prominent of the three initial meteorologists. He was known for using self-hand-drawn weather maps incorporating isobars and upper-level atmospheric diagrams to illustrate his forecasts, which were eventually replaced by computerized graphics in November 1982, and developed the concept of trained "weather watchers", volunteer observationalists from surrounding counties who gathered up-to-date weather data. His popularity among viewers led to a successful grassroots campaign (which included threats of advertising boycotts by area businesses) urging KXAS station management to retain Taft after plans to replace him became public in 1983. Taft held the record as the state's longest-serving television meteorologist, having served as chief meteorologist at WBAP-TV/KXAS for 41 years until his retirement on August 30, 1991, one month prior to his death from stomach cancer. Harold Taft's memorial service was carried live by Channel 5. David Finfrock, who first joined KXAS in 1976 as a meteorologist for its weekend evening newscasts, subsequently took over as chief weather anchor. Finfrock has since eclipsed the length of Taft's tenure as an on-air meteorologist. In 1993, KXAS became the first television station in the United States to implement a Local Weather Station structure, a network of sensors that relayed real-time weather observations.

On June 16, 1966, Channel 5 became the first television station in Texas to present all of its news film footage in color. In 1967, Fort Worth native Bob Schieffer began his broadcast career at WBAP-TV as a reporter and anchor of the station's 10 p.m. newscast. After leaving the station in 1971, Schieffer went on to Washington, D.C. to work as a reporter for WTTG and the now-defunct Metromedia news service, then embarked on a long career with CBS News that lasted until his retirement from full-time broadcasting in August 2015 and continued thereafter in a contributing role. In February 1970, WBAP-TV debuted the first locally produced television newsmagazine, Texas '70s, a monthly half-hour program showcasing feature reports focusing on the culture of Texas.

On January 11, 1986, a KXAS news crew was assigned to cover a standoff started by 40-year-old Thomas E. Stephens, when he barricaded himself inside an Arlington 7-Eleven store where his estranged wife, Patricia (who filed divorce papers that Thomas was served with the day before), had managed. Believing she had initiated the idea of the divorce to Patricia, Thomas fatally shot her roommate and store clerk, Terry Palmer, and wounded fellow employee Craig Talley; Patricia later snuck out of the store's front door as Thomas talked to a hostage negotiator over the phone. Around 6:40 pm, during an update on the standoff within the extended 6 p.m. newscast as a live shot outside the store was being shown, the videographer on-scene captured Thomas coming out and killing himself with a .357-caliber pistol, ending the seven-hour standoff. Weekend anchor Mike Snyder, who joined KXAS in 1980 and served as the main anchor of the weeknight newscasts from 1992 until he retired from broadcasting in 2013, issued an on-air apology to viewers for the live broadcast of the suicide.

In 1989, KXAS became the first television station in Texas to implement closed captioning for its newscasts. In 1993, KXAS-TV launched the "Public Defenders", an investigative reporting unit (consisting of reporters Sabrina Smith, Mike Androvett, and Marty Griffin) that conducted investigations into businesses that have ripped off local consumers and uncovered various consumer scams as an ongoing segment during the 10 p.m. newscast until 1999. On March 28, 2000, the tower camera based in Sundance Square in Fort Worth caught footage of a multiple-vortex F3 tornado that struck the city's downtown area. Master control operators cut to footage of that tornado as it tracked northeastward through central Fort Worth; after a tornado warning was issued for Tarrant County, chief meteorologist David Finfrock—who was in the middle of a weather segment during that evening's 6 p.m. newscast—warned viewers about the damaging tornado through on-air illustration via the live camera footage. The station also became notable for an impromptu moment on August 9, 2002, when during a wildlife segment featured on its late-morning newscast, then-anchor Michael Scott got spooked by a gecko that was to be presented later in the segment, which jumped onto him from a nearby table; the clip eventually became one of the earliest viral videos, when it was circulated on YouTube and other video sharing websites later that decade.

On September 7, 2007, KXAS-TV became the second television station in the Dallas–Fort Worth market (after WFAA) to begin broadcasting its local newscasts in high definition. Segments conducted in-studio were initially the only content that was broadcast in the format, with field video footage being transmitted in 16:9 widescreen standard definition, before upgrading to HD in concurrence with the move to The Studios at DFW in September 2013. On January 16, 2009, as part of a Local News Service agreement that had earlier been formed between NBC Owned Television Stations and Fox Television Stations, KXAS began sharing its news helicopter (branded as "Chopper 5") with Fox owned-and-operated station KDFW, with the two stations pooling footage from the helicopter during breaking news coverage.

Historically since the 1970s, KXAS has placed second or third overall in local news viewership, behind longtime leader WFAA and KDFW. According to the local Nielsen ratings for the February 2011 sweeps period, KXAS placed second in the 6 a.m. time period among total viewers and adults age 25–54 years old; this in direct comparison to the same time period the year before, when it placed first in that timeslot, aided by NBC's coverage of the 2010 Winter Olympics in Vancouver. KXAS placed third at 5 p.m. among total viewers and adults 25–54, in last place at 6 p.m. among both total viewers and with adults 25–54, and placed third at 10 p.m. with total viewers and last with 25- to 54-year-olds.

For the May 2011 sweeps period, the 10 p.m. newscast placed last among adults 25–54 and in third with total viewers (overall, all four stations showed year-to-year gains in total viewers while only KXAS was down slightly among 25-to-54-year-olds); the station's morning newscast had placed third in both demographics. In total viewers, the 5 and 6 p.m. newscasts also finished in last place among the Metroplex's late newscasts, though the 5 p.m. newscast was in third (behind KTVT) in the 25- to 54-year-old demographic (the 6 p.m. newscast placed last behind KTVT among adults 25–54). The morning newscast was the only local news program on KXAS to rank above third place in total viewership (though it, along with KTVT and WFAA's morning newscasts all lost viewers in both key demos to KDFW, which ranked first).

On June 20, 2016, KXAS began to implement the "Look N" graphics package designed for NBC's owned-and-operated stations by NBC ArtWorks, placing the station under the graphical standardizations applied to its fellow O&Os for the first time since 2012 (the "Look G" package used by KXAS from 2012 to 2014 has since been used by Nexstar Broadcasting Group for its NBC affiliates, including those in nearby markets such as KFDX-TV in Wichita Falls and KRBC in Abilene) and makes reference to the trademarking of the "Texas Connects Us" slogan that KXAS has used since 2012 (one of a handful of station slogans to have received trademark approval by the U.S. Patent and Trademark Office for exclusive and/or licensing use). On July 9, 2016, the station expanded its Saturday 6 p.m. newscast to an hour with a half-hour extension at 6:30 p.m.

On May 13, 2017, KXAS-TV added an extra half-hour to its weekend morning newscast at 5:30 a.m.

On June 29, 2021, beginning with the 4 p.m. newscast, KXAS officially switched to the new graphics package entitled "Look S", just two days after sister station KNBC in Los Angeles switched to the new graphics package and a week after WMAQ-TV in Chicago debuting it. Meanwhile, the "Texas Connects Us" slogan appears in the opening sequence instead of the usual "NBC" text unlike to the former two.

The station has received criticism in recent years for its handling of weather coverage, particularly during sporting events. Channel 5 waited six minutes before cutting into a 2019 Cowboys Sunday Night Football game with a warning about a tornado that had touched down within the market. Station management admitted that they had erred in not immediately breaking away from the game for a potentially life-threatening situation. Conversely, in 2024, KXAS interrupted the end of a playoff game between the Los Angeles Rams and Detroit Lions for a report about light snowfall. According to weather anchor Rick Mitchell, that segment was supposed to air on a subchannel and not the main NBC channel. "It was not our intention to ruin the end of the game," he said in apologizing for the mix-up.

==== Notable former on-air staff ====
- Matt Barrie – sports anchor
- Gretchen Carlson – anchor/reporter
- Marc Fein – anchor (2011–2019)
- Jay Gray – reporter (1993–2000)
- Lillard Hill – anchor (1948–1954)
- Calvin Hughes – anchor/reporter (1995–1999)
- Karen Hughes (then, Karen Parfitt) – reporter
- Jane Jayroe – anchor/reporter (1980–1984)
- Boyd Matson – reporter (1970–late 1970s)
- David Ono – reporter (1990s)
- Scott Pelley – reporter
- Charlie Rose – host of The Charlie Rose Show and The Baxters (1979–1980)
- Bob Schieffer – anchor/reporter
- Harold Taft – meteorologist (1949–1991)
- Joe Tessitore – sports anchor

== Technical information ==
=== Subchannels ===
The station's signal is multiplexed:

Subchannels of KXAS-TV
Subchannel	Res.	Short name	Programming
5.1	1080i	KXAS-DT	NBC
5.2	480i	COZI-TV	Cozi TV
5.3	480i	CRIMES	NBC True CRMZ
