= Audronė Galvonaitė =

Lithuanian geographer, meteorologist (born 1949)

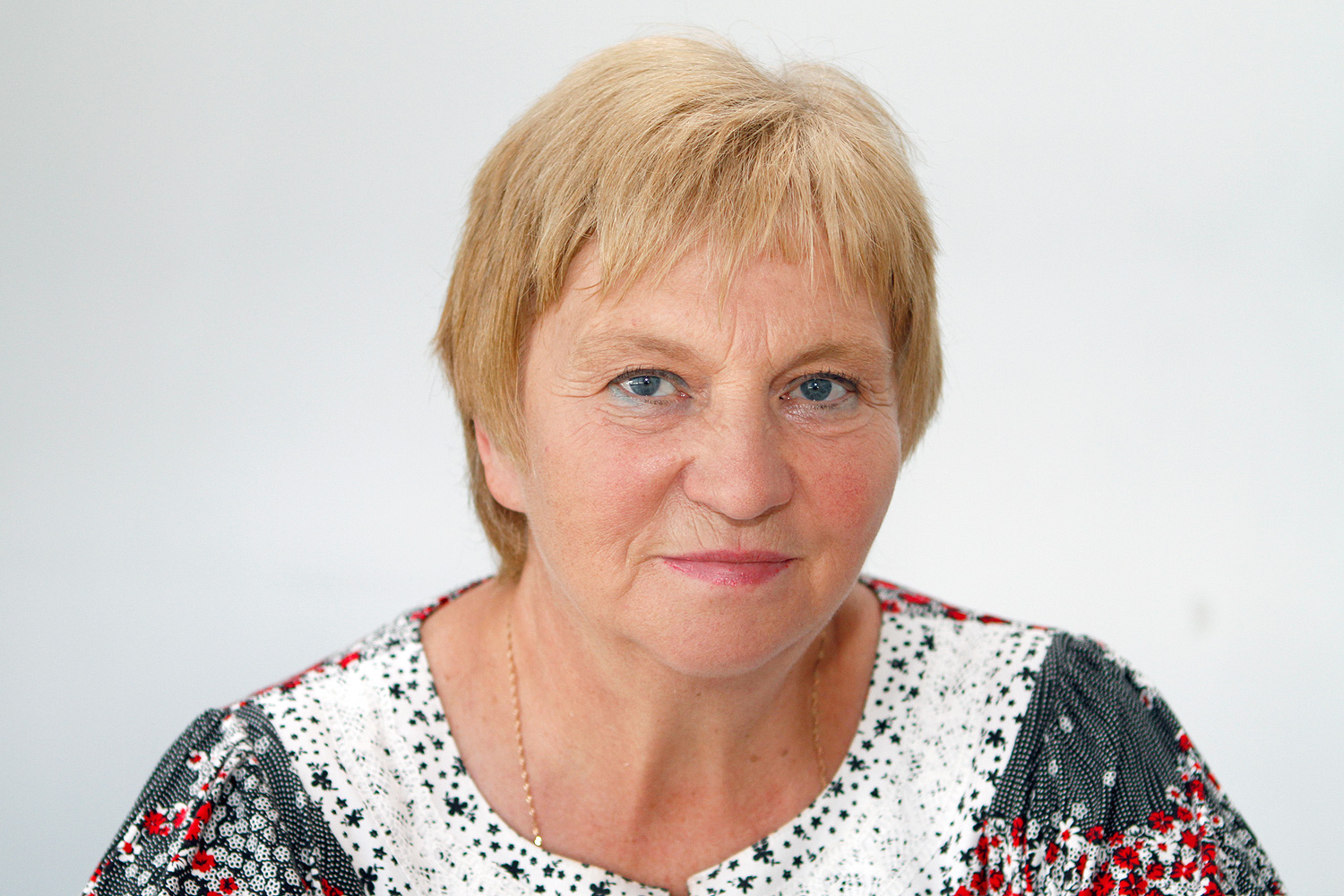
- Born: September 21, 1949 (age 77); Anykščiai, Lithuania
- Education: Vilnius University
- Occupations: Geographer, meteorologist
- Known for: Popularizing meteorological science

Audronė Galvonaitė (born 21 September 1949) is a Lithuanian geographer, meteorologist, doctor of physical sciences and a popularizer of meteorological science.

== Biography ==
Galvonaitė was born in Anykščiai, Lithuania, to Vytautas Galvonas and Stasė Padskocmaitė-Galvonienė. The family lived in several Estonian cities before returning to Anykščiai, where she completed elementary and secondary school. In 1967, she began studying at the Faculty of Natural Sciences at Vilnius University and graduated with a degree in geography in 1972. For one year, she taught geography at a school in Mickūnai (Anykščiai district). Beginning in 1993, she worked at the Institute of Physics and Mathematics at the Lithuanian Academy of Sciences, 1977–1992, first as an engineer and later as a research associate. Since 1992, she has led the Climatology and Methodology Department of the Lithuanian Hydrometeorological Service.

In 1993, she studied at the Institute of Physics and Vilnius University to defend her PhD thesis: "Influence of Meteorological Factors on Atmospheric Pollution in Lithuania" about synoptic meteorology, which examines the synoptic-climatological typification of atmospheric processes during rainy periods, the effect of inversions and isotherms on the subsurface thermal field, and atmospheric ozone. She has also researched the factors that shape the climate, analyzed its peculiarities and changes and popularized meteorological knowledge through radio, television and the press. She has participated in international programs on climate change issues, including one in Spain in 1997 where she gave a presentation on southern cyclones. Since 2003, she has served as the Lithuanian representative to the United Nations' World Meteorological Organization. She has published more than 100 scientific papers from meteorology and climatology.

Galvonaitė has been an active popularizer of meteorological science by contributing to radio shows, sharing scientific information on the Internet and lecturing in local communities. Since 2019, she has been a climate and weather commentator for the Lithuanian TV program "Panorama." At the Lithuanian Hydrometeorological Service, she was responsible for the installation of the historical exposition of meteorology.

Since 1973, she has lived in Vilnius.

== Selected works ==
- Galvonaitė, Audronė. "Lietuvos hidrometeorologijos tarnybos prie Aplinkos ministerijos Klimatologijos skyrius: Vidutinės klimatinių rodiklių reikšmės Lietuvoje 1981–2010 m." Climate averages for Lithuania 2010 (1981): 2013.
- Galvonaitė, Audronė, Monika Misiūnienė, Donatas Valiukas, and Marija S. Buitkuvienė. "Lithuanian climate." Lithuanian service of hidrometeorology: Vilnius 180 (2007).
- Lukšienė, Benedikta, Danutė Marčiulionienė, Andrej Rožkov, Arūnas Gudelis, Elis Holm, and Audronė Galvonaitė. "Distribution of artificial gamma-ray emitting radionuclide activity concentration in the top soil in the vicinity of the Ignalina Nuclear Power Plant and other regions in Lithuania." Science of the total environment 439 (2012): 96–105.
- Ozolinčius, Remigijus, Edmundas Lekevičius, Vidas Stakėnas, Audronė Galvonaitė, Arūnas Samas, and Donatas Valiukas. "Lithuanian forests and climate change: possible effects on tree species composition." European Journal of Forest Research 133 (2014): 51–60.
