= Mel Goldstein =

American meteorologist (1945 – 2012)

Melvin G. Goldstein (October 23, 1945 – January 18, 2012), known on air as Dr. Mel, was an on-air television meteorologist and eventual chief meteorologist weekday mornings for WTNH in New Haven, Connecticut, from 1986 to 2011. He also served as the meteorologist for the radio station WLAD in Danbury, Connecticut from the mid-1970s to 2012 and for WQUN in Hamden, Connecticut.

== Early life and education ==
Goldstein was born in Swampscott, Massachusetts, in 1945, where, as Goldstein himself put it, "the conversation was always about the weather." He earned a degree in meteorology from Penn State in 1967, followed by a doctorate from New York University.

== Career ==
In 1972, Goldstein took up a teaching job at Western Connecticut State University. He established Connecticut's only meteorology bachelor's degree, and began to run WestConn's weather center, which supplied forecasting information to 20 local radio and television stations. He went on to receive a Bachelor of Science in meteorology from Penn State University, and then M.S. and Ph. D. degrees in meteorology from New York University. He developed a severe storm prediction index that is utilized by numerous electric utilities across the country, and he has been a consultant to a number of large firms including IBM, Union Carbide, General Electric, Detroit Edison, Philadelphia Electric, Northeast Utilities and United Illuminating. Goldstein joined WTNH as a meteorologist in 1986, becoming a local celebrity and eventually WTNH's chief meteorologist. In 1999, he authored the Complete Idiot's Guide to Weather. He held the honorary title of Director Emeritus at WestConn's Weather Center. Goldstein was a member of the American Meteorological Society with the television seal of approval, and a member of the National Weather Association.

== Personal life ==
In 1996, Goldstein was diagnosed with [[multiple myeloma]], which the prognosis his doctors predicted would claim his life within three years. Hoping to beat the diagnosis, Goldstein underwent treatment at Yale-New Haven Hospital, far outliving his initial prognosis.

He returned to work at WTNH, though as the diagnosis started to take a toll on his overall health, WTNH management and Goldstein agreed to a scale down his on-air time to a part-time schedule .

== Retirement ==
On August 23, 2011, WTNH announced Goldstein's retirement after 25 years of service. In celebration of his over two decades of service, the station produced a prime-time tribute to Goldstein noting all he did for the station over the years.

In the summer of 2015, weekday meteorologist Gil Simmons was promoted to Chief Meteorologist. His on-air schedule was expanded to include the noon weekday newscasts along with his current weekday morning schedule for News8's Good Morning Connecticut which currently runs from 4:00-7:00 AM. and 9:00-10:00 A.M., filling Goldstein's on-air time slot after his retirement.

Later on the noon newscasts would be discontinued from Simmons' schedule after the hiring of a new weekend/fill-in meteorologist, shifting a member of the weather team from weekends to weekdays at noon and 4:00 P.M. Simmons started at WTNH in February 2003.

== Death ==
On January 18, 2012, Mel Goldstein died from complications and declining health after a 16 year battle with multiple myeloma at the age of 66. He is survived by his wife Arlene and two daughters Laura and Melodie.

On August 20, 2012 Goldstein's wife Arlene, Mayor Joseph Maturo, Jr. and the town of East Haven hosted a brief ceremony along with other officials, family, and friends to unveil a memorial park bench with a special engraved message in Mel's honor which was placed at the East Haven town beach. The bench was donated by Goldstein's wife Arlene, who died a few years later.
