= Theo A. Johnsen =

Theo A. Johnsen (1857–1911) was a pioneer U.S. manufacturer of ski equipment and related gear. Johnsen is especially notable for writing the first book on skiing published in America. He was posthumously inducted into the Maine Ski Hall of Fame, a division of the Ski Museum of Maine.

Born in Manchester, England, Johnsen emigrated to Portland, Maine, as a 21-year-old apprentice cabinetmaker and was employed in his father's woodworking business. He became interested in skiing by reading an article in the April, 1895 issue of Scientific American and took up the sport with passion.

Johnsen started his own manufacturing business in Portland in 1904: Tajco Sporting Goods specialized in building gasoline-powered pleasure boats ─ a novelty at the time ─ plus snowshoes, ski gear and push sleds. The 1905 Tajco winter sports catalogue lists 12 models of skis at prices from $3.50 to $18. Related gear included five binding models and five styles of ski poles ─ described as “push sticks.”

To help sell his products, Johnsen published The Winter Sport of Skeeing in 1905. The little book included 38 pages of description and detailed how-to instructions for cross-country, downhill and jumping. The Tajco winter sports catalogue comprised the final 16 pages. A replica edition of The Winter Sport of Skeeing was published in 1994 by the International Skiing History Association.

The Winter Sport of Skeeing is notable for Johnsen's buoyantly upbeat writing style and his depiction of skiing as a joyous recreational activity. Its numerous photographs show men and women blissfully enjoying themselves on Tajco products. The introductory chapter includes the statement that “skeeing is the most exhilarating, most fascinating, most healthful and most delightful of all the winter sports, and that, indulged in sensibly and not to excess, it is indeed an ideal outdoor pastime for everybody young and old.”

Tajco skis sold poorly and Johnsen closed the company in 1907. He died near Boston, Massachusetts in 1911.

Johnsen was a visionary with little commercial acumen, according to ski historian Glenn Parkinson's book First Tracks: Stories from Maine’s Skiing Heritage. Parkinson noted that Johnsen's catalogue emphasized expensive ski gear at a time when the sport was in its infancy in America and the U.S. market was dominated by cheap products.

Parkinson's assessment of the pioneer ski manufacturer concludes: “Theo A. Johnsen recognized the fundamental changes about to happen in two sports yet was unable to capitalize on either one. But he had left a bequest to the sport of skiing ─ America’s first ski book, a testimonial matched in fervor by few skiers since.”

Johnsen was honored by induction into the 2003 inaugural class of the Maine Ski Hall of Fame, a division of the Ski Museum of Maine.

Early in 2009 the museum acquired a collection of 10 hand-made miniature Johnsen skis ─ 18-inch models that were once used by traveling salesmen. The New England Ski Museum owns and displays the only known extant pair of Tajco skis.
