= Gil Simmons =

American meteorologist

Gil Simmons is the chief weekday morning meteorologist for WTNH-TV, the local ABC-affiliated television station for the Hartford-New Haven, Connecticut television market. He also is the meteorologist for WTNH's sister station, WCTX-TV, the MyNetworkTV-affiliated television station in that market, and for WATR, an AM station located in Waterbury that serves the Naugatuck Valley.

Simmons was named chief meteorologist weekdays for WTNH in 2015 taking over duties for former chief meteorologist Mel Goldstein known on the air as Dr. Mel who scaled back to a part-time on-air presence before retiring in 2011 after 25 years at the station. (Goldstein died a year later after a years-long battle with Multiple myeloma)

Simmons' schedule was later shifted from the weekday morning and noon newscasts to solely weekday mornings on Good Morning Connecticut from 4:00-7:00 A.M. and 9:00-10:00 A.M.

He served on active duty in the United States Marine Corps as a meteorologist/oceanographer for six years (1990-1996) and reached the rank of SSGT. He then moved back to Connecticut to forecast the weather locally, and started at WTNH in February 2003. Simmons resides in southern central Connecticut.

Simmons received an Emmy nomination for his snowstorm coverage in Connecticut and was awarded 2002 Best Weathercast in Connecticut by the Associated Press.

A native of Foster, Rhode Island and Killingly, Connecticut, Simmons is a graduate of Western Connecticut State University, a member of the American Meteorological Society with the television seal of approval, and a member of the National Weather Association.

== Personal life ==
Simmons is an outdoorsman and avid snowmobiler making trips to northern New England during the winter months. Other hobbies include motorcycle riding, skiing, landscaping, and big trucks. He also maintains his own weather website, Weather4Connecticut, in his spare time.

Simmons also sets time aside to participate in a variety of community fundraisers and events. He jumps into an icy lake every Thanksgiving Day morning to help raise money for muscular dystrophy. He is also active with the Multiple Sclerosis Society, American Heart Association, North Haven Education Foundation, Red Cross, participates in the annual walk to help find a cure for Alzheimer's disease, and numerous other charities. He is committed to honoring the veteran and military community by hosting numerous yearly Veteran events including Honor Flight Connecticut and The Connecticut Veterans' Hall of Fame. He also has ridden his Harley in breast cancer benefit rides. He also has a love for animals.
