= Julia Emily Johnsen =

American author and editor

- Born: March 17, 1881; Milwaukee, Wisconsin
- Died: December 18, 1971 (aged 90); Los Angeles, California
- Occupations: author, editor

Julia Emily Johnsen (March 17, 1881- December 18, 1971) was an American author and editor known for compiling and editing reference works on social and political issues.

== Early life ==
Johnsen was born in Milwaukee, Wisconsin in 1881 to John Johnsen and Emma Halverson. She had a brother, Fred, and a sister, Ruth. Her father was a Norwegian immigrant. She published a poem in the oralist publication, The Volta Review, in 1921 implying that she may have had a hearing impairment but little is known about her personal life. She was a supporter of the Theosophical Society and made a substantial bequest to their headquarters in India. She worked as a librarian in Minneapolis according to census records, and then moved to New York City when her employer relocated there.

== Career ==
Johnsen worked for H.W. Wilson Company as an editor and compiler. Her first publication was a short bibliography entitled Selected Articles on the Recall about the recall of judges. The volume included a summary of the arguments for and against, a selected bibliography, and the reprint of a few short excerpts from articles on the topic. Her later publications for Wilson would replicate this format, called "debaters handbooks," which were in high demand at debate classes and clubs at the time. She primarily assembled works on social issues including racial issues, prison reform, birth control, the Ku Klux Klan and Palestine. In 1934 she worked with Stanley Kunitz and Howard Haycraft to compile material for the publication The Junior Book of Authors, a 400-page illustrated reference work about notable authors which would be accessible for children.

Johnsen created works for two major series by Wilson: the Debaters Handbook Series including such titles as Selected Articles on The Negro Problem (1921) and Selected articles on Social insurance (1922); and The Reference Shelf which included titles such as Metric System (1926) and Financing of State Highways (1929). The latter series, available through individual purchase or a subscription, included many titles seeking answers about a world during and after World War II. In 1943, she compiled a collection of then-current world peace plans which received favorable reviews for her compilation skills. Johnsen worked for Wilson through at least 1950, receiving an award for her forty years of service at the company in June of that year.

== Critical reception ==
Johnsen's work along with the work of her female colleagues in the Handbook Series was said to be "an intriguing counterpoint to the early male debaters whose success often depended on the thoroughness and analysis of women who were as much as a generation older than they were." Her publications were popular with libraries and her works have been described as "splendid cross-section[s]," "invaluable collection[s] of material," and "what a reference volume should be." She would often write explanatory notes in her works' front matter about the social importance and implications of her topics. Her approaches to complex topics were called "remarkably dispassionate... thorough in comprehension and fair in treatment." Johnsen herself said that her work represented "material on various phases of a controversial question."

== Bibliography ==
Johnsen worked for H. W. Wilson for her entire professional life and published over eighty volumes, many of which went into second updated editions.

- Selected Articles on the Recall (1911)
- Selected Articles on Unemployment (1915)
- Selected Articles on Athletics (1917)
- Selected Articles on Municipal Ownership (1918)
- Selected Articles on Independence For the Philippines (1921)
- Selected Articles on the Negro Problem (1921)
- China and Japan: a Study Outline (1922)
- Selected Articles on Social Insurance (1922)
- Kansas Court of Industrial Relations (1922)
- Cancellation of the Allied Debt (1922)
- St Lawrence River Ship Canal (1922)
- Ku Klux Klan (1923)
- Selected Articles on Government Ownership of Coal Mines (1923)
- Permanent Court of International Justice (1923)
- League of Nations (1924)
- Independence For the Philippines (1924)
- Selected Articles on Marriage and Divorce (1925)
- Selected Articles on Birth Control (1925)
- Academic Freedom (1925)
- Japanese Exclusion (1925)
- Selected Articles on Child Labor (1925)
- Selected Articles on War--Cause and Cure (1926)
- Special Legislation For Women (1926)
- Metric System (1926)
- Child Labor (1926)
- Federal Department of Education (1926)
- Government Regulation of the Coal Industry (Supplementary To Handbook "Government Ownership of Coal Mines") (1926)
- Selected Articles on War--Cause and Cure (1926)
- Agriculture and the Tariff (1927)
- Questions of the Hour (1927)
- Selected Articles on a Federal Department of Education (1927)
- Jury System (1928)
- Selected Articles on China Yesterday and Today (By Julia E Johnsen and Ping Wen Kuo (1928))
- Federal and State Control of Water Power (1928)
- Selected Articles on National Defense (1928)
- Selected Articles on China Yesterday and Today (1928)
- Thirteen-Month Calendar (1929)
- Financing the State Highways (1929)
- Interscholastic Athletics (1929)
- The Baumes Law (1929)
- Free Trade (1930)
- Conscription of Wealth In Time of War (1930)
- Disarmament (1930)
- Selected Articles on Law Enforcement (1930)
- County Libraries (1930)
- Capitalism on Trial (1931)
- Stability of Employment (1931)
- Chinese-Japanese War (1933)
- Increasing the President's Power (1933)
- Federal Aid To Education (1933)
- Selected Articles on Capitalism and Its Alternatives (1933)
- International Traffic In Arms and Munitions (1934)
- Selected Articles on the Problem of Liquor Control (1934)
- Limitation of Power of Supreme Court To Declare Acts of Congress Unconstitutional (1935)
- Socialization of Medicine (1935)
- Collective Bargaining (1935)
- Old Age Pensions (1935)
- Government Ownership of Electric Utilities (1936)
- Freedom of Speech (1936)
- The Neutrality Policy of the United States (1936)
- Reorganization of the Supreme Court (1937)
- Chinese-Japanese War, (1937-) (1938)
- Peace and Rearmament (1938)
- The United States and War (1939)
- Trade Unions and the Anti-Trust Laws (1940)
- Interstate Trade Barriers (1940)
- The National Labor Relations Act: Should It Be Amended? (1940)
- Trade Unions and the Anti-Trust Laws (1940)
- Compulsory Military Training (1941)
- Federal Aid For Education (1941)
- Plans For a Post-War World (1942)
- Permanent Price Control Policy (1942)
- Federal Price Control (1942)
- The Closed Shop (1942)
- The "Eight Points" of Post-War World Reorganization (1942)
- World Peace Plans (1943)
- Reconstituting the League of Nations (1943)
- Wage Stabilization and Inflation (1943)
- Independence For India? (1943)
- Canada and the Western Hemisphere (1944)
- Basic English (1944)
- International Police Force (1944)
- Lowering the Voting Age (1944)
- Peacetime Conscription (1945)
- Postwar Wage Stabilization (1945)
- Compulsory Arbitration of Labor Disputes (1945)
- The Atomic Bomb (1946)
- Palestine: Jewish Homeland? (1946)
- United Nations; Or, World Government (1947)
- Federal World Government (1948)
- The Dilemma of Postwar Germany (1948)
- Should the Communist Party Be Outlawed? (1949)
- Direct Election of the President (1949)
- British Socialism Today (1950)
- The Investigating Powers of Congress (1951)
