= Gladys Johnsen =

American politician from New Hampshire

Member of New Hampshire House of Representatives for Cheshire 7
- In office 2010–2018
- Succeeded by: Sparky Von Plinsky

Personal details
- Born: October 15, 1942 (age 83)
- Party: Democratic

Gladys Johnsen (born October 15, 1942) is an American politician. She was a member of the New Hampshire House of Representatives.
