= Harold Taft =

American weather broadcaster (1922–1991)

- Born: Harold Taft; September 5, 1922; Enid, Oklahoma, US
- Died: September 27, 1991 (aged 69); Fort Worth, Texas, US
- Occupations: Weather presenter, television and radio personality
- Years active: 1949–1991
- Spouse: Eleanor Taft (1922-2004) Pat Taft (1927-1994)

Harold Earnest Taft Jr. (September 5, 1922 – September 27, 1991), affectionately known as "The World's Greatest Weatherman" and "The Dean of TV Meteorologists", was the first television meteorologist west of the Mississippi River and held the post for a record 41 years.

A native of Enid, Oklahoma, he joined the Army Air Corps during World War II, and went to the University of Chicago to study meteorology. Taft was a second lieutenant stationed in Maine on D-Day. He has been erroneously credited with assisting Dwight D. Eisenhower in setting the date of the D-Day invasion. His input from Maine may have been of minor help, but he was still too young and inexperienced to have been involved in major decisions. However, by Korea, he assisted with tactical planning where weather was a factor. He graduated from Phillips University in 1946 and joined American Airlines as a staff meteorologist.

== Television meteorology ==
In 1949, Taft and two fellow American Airlines meteorologists, Bob Denney and Walter Porter, proposed a nightly weather program to WBAP-TV (now KXAS). “We told them we would present a three-dimensional look at the weather, and we would call it Weather Telefacts, because we wanted to explain the weather to people,” he later said. The three meteorologists were hired, Taft as chief meteorologist at the rate of $7 per show, and at 10:15 p.m. on October 31, 1949, Weather Telefacts premiered.

Harold's weather forecasts also aired on WBAP radio, where overnight personality Bill Mack nicknamed him "The World's Greatest Weatherman". Much in the style of Chicago weathercaster Tom Skilling, Taft resisted dumbing down of his presentations, explaining complicated meteorological concepts in layman's terms where needed and enhancing charts with isobars and upper-level diagrams. This was occasionally a source of conflict with KXAS producers.

When new management at KXAS planned to replace Taft in the early 1980s, a grassroots campaign bombarded the station with complaints. Bumper stickers proclaiming "I Believe Harold" began appearing and advertisers threatened to pull their business. Management relented, and Taft remained a permanent part of KXAS' news programs.

== Illness and death ==
In the late 1980s, Taft was diagnosed with stomach cancer. During his chemotherapy treatments, which left him frail and bald, he presented a series of reports on his health problems. In spite of the hardships, Taft continued to forecast the weather. Even during his last year of life, he continued to present weather reports on the 5pm and 6pm newscasts. One of his colleagues noted that he was so ill that he had to lie down and rest between the two newscasts. His last weather broadcast was August 30, 1991, 41 years and 10 months after his first broadcast, and he died a month later.

A devout Lutheran, Taft had been a regular cornet player at St. John Lutheran Church in Grand Prairie and King of Glory Lutheran Church in Fort Worth. His funeral service had to be moved to St. Stephen's Presbyterian Church, one of Fort Worth's largest churches, to accommodate the crowd of mourners and a live KXAS broadcast. Taft's rival of 15 years, chief weather anchor Troy Dungan of WFAA-TV, attended the service. Taft is survived by his 2 children from a first marriage to Eleanor Huff Taft, Janice Taft Spooner and Earnest Taft, several stepchildren from a second marriage, and son Rafael Taft.

Taft was posthumously presented the Award for Outstanding Service by a Broadcasting Meteorologist by the American Meteorological Society. He received the award "in recognition of his warmth as a broadcaster and his professionalism as a forecaster."

His widow, Pat, died in 1994, and his first wife Eleanor died in 2004.

== Accomplishments and legacy ==
- In 1955, Taft served on an American Meteorological Society committee that recommended that the society establish what eventually became their Seal of Approval for broadcast meteorologists.
- Taft served as a colonel in the Texas Air National Guard, and he was often referred to as "Colonel Taft" on the air, especially through the 1970s.
- In 1975, Taft was co-author of the book "Texas Weather" with fellow KXAS meteorologist Ron Godbey.
- In 1985, Taft testified as an expert witness on wind shear, which he identified as the cause of the crash of Delta Air Lines Flight 191 on August 2, 1985 at Dallas/Fort Worth International Airport.
- In 1989, Taft was named in the fictional Star Trek reference book "Worlds of the Federation" as the United Federation of Planets' Ambassador to planet Izar, which is home to a prominent meteorology institute.
- In September 2008, KXAS began awarding a Harold Taft Scholarship for undergraduate meteorology students in association with the Lone Star Emmy Educational Foundation. The awards were presented by his daughter Janice Taft Spooner and his oldest granddaughter Denise Spooner Buckner.
- In 2002 Harold Taft's 41-year record of "world's longest-serving TV meteorologist" was superseded by Canadian Dave Devall, who retired with 49 years of experience.
- As part of the opening of KXAS' new studio building in 2013, one of three conference rooms in the new building was named for Taft. The Taft Conference Room features a printed mural on one wall with various photo images of Taft from throughout his career with the station.
- At a ceremony held in June 2017, the Press Club of Dallas posthumously gave one of 13 'North Texas Legends' recognitions to Harold Taft; it marked the first time the Press Club had presented a recognition to a deceased person who had been active in the radio or TV community in the Dallas-Fort Worth area.
