= Rely Zlatarovic =

Austrian-trained meteorologist

Rely Zlatarovic, (fl. 1920) was a woman meteorologist who measured radon gas levels in samples taken from the outdoor air in Innsbruck, Austria.

== Work ==
In 1920, Zlatarovic created a new method for measuring radioactive gases (radon) in air samples. She used a technique that she developed at the Physical Institute of the University of Innsbruck, and gathered evidence that precipitation reduced the amount of radon in the air.

Specifically, she used a combination of charcoal and petroleum as absorbents and an ionization vessel and showed that the presence of radon increased the electricity of the atmosphere. She found that the only factors that could cause changes were rainy periods of weather, which corresponded with lower emanation values. She published her findings in Chemical Abstracts.

== Publication ==
- Zlatarovic, R. (1920). Measurements of the Ra emanation content in the air of Innsbruck: From the Institute of Physics of the University of Innsbruck. pp. 59–66
