= Igor Delijanić =

Igor Delijanić (Serbian Cyrillic: Игор Делијанић, 1927 in Belgrade – March 2, 2007 in Belgrade) was one of the most known Serbian meteorologists. Author of many books about meteorology, e.g. Osnovi meteorologije (1976, Fundamentals of meteorology), Klimatologija (1996, Climatology), Opšta meteorologija (General meteorology) and Meteorologija sa klimatologijom (2006, Meteorology with climatology). From 1970 to 1984 he was director of Republic Hydrometeorological Service of Serbia (Republički Hidrometeorološki Zavod Srbije), credited for modernizing the service. He was also head of department of climatology in Yugoslavian Federal Hydrometeorological Institute (Савезни хидрометеоролошки завод) until his retirement in 1991.
