= Jan-Erik Johnsen =

Norwegian meteorologist (bor. 1942)

Jan-Erik Johnsen (born 1942) is a Norwegian meteorologist and weather presenter.

He was hired in the Norwegian Meteorological Institute, and became a prime time weather presenter for the Norwegian Broadcasting Corporation in 1970. He retired in December 2007.
