= Tri-state tornado =

Tri-state tornado may refer to:

- 1925 tri-state tornado outbreak, a large tornado outbreak that spawned the deadliest tornado in United States history
  - 1925 tri-state tornado, the largest tornado in the outbreak
- 1974 Cincinnati tornado, a destructive tornado that crossed over Indiana, Kentucky and Ohio
- 2021 Monette–Samburg tornado, a violent EF4 tornado that caused damage in Arkansas, Missouri, and Tennessee
