= 1974 Tanner tornadoes =

Pair of F5 tornadoes in 1974

- Damage to vehicles in Tanner after the tornadoes

Meteorological history
- Formed: April 3, 1974, 6:15 p.m. CDT (UTC-5:00) (First tornado); April 3, 1974, 7:35 p.m. CDT (UTC-5:00) (Second tornado)
- Dissipated: April 3, 1974, 7:28 p.m. CDT) (UTC-5:00) (First tornado); April 3, 1974, 9:05 p.m. CDT) (UTC-5:00) (Second tornado)
- Duration: 2 hours 43 minutes (total)

F5 tornadoes
- Path length: 135 mi (217 km) (total)
- Highest winds: >260 mph (420 km/h)

Overall effects
- Fatalities: 44
- Injuries: 457
- Areas affected: Tanner, Alabama and surrounding communities.
- Part of the 1974 Super Outbreak and Tornadoes of 1974

In the evening hours of April 3, 1974, two large and destructive tornadoes sequentially impacted the small town of Tanner, located in the state of Alabama. Both of these tornadoes would receive an F5 rating on the Fujita scale and were two out of seven F5-rated tornadoes to touch down as part of the 1974 Super Outbreak, one of the largest tornado outbreaks in United States history. Each of the tornadoes claimed over fifteen lives, and would kill a combined total of fifty-five people, many in the Tanner area; over four hundred more would be injured.

The first tornado would touch down in Lawrence County, moving towards Mt. Moriah. As the tornado passed over the town, it hit a home and killed six people. The tornado would continue to produce extreme damage as it moved to the northeast, ripping water pumps out of the ground and obliterating large objects. The tornado would then cross the Tennessee River as a waterspout, before hitting Tanner. The town was devastated, with many structures in the area completely destroyed and the ground near Tanner being scoured. The tornado would lift seventy-three minutes after forming, leaving behind a trail of destruction.

The second tornado would touch down a short time later, traveling parallel to the previous tornado before hitting the southern portions of Tanner, killing several people. Many of the structures in Tanner that had survived the first tornado would be destroyed by the second one. It would continue to move to the northeast, striking the communities of Capshaw, Harvest, and Hazel Green before lifting. It would kill sixteen, injure almost two hundred others, and was on the ground for over an hour.

Tanner was particularly devastated by both tornadoes. While rescue and recovery efforts were underway in Tanner in the immediate aftermath of the first tornado, the second tornado would cause more destruction in the town. Over 1,000 buildings sustained some level of damage from the tornadoes, and an estimated 200 mobile homes were obliterated as the tornadoes moved by. The majority of tornadic injuries in Alabama on April 3 were caused by both tornadoes.

== Meteorological synopsis ==
Earlier on April 3, three bands of convection would develop, the third developing at about 16:00 UTC and extended from near St. Louis into west-central Illinois. Based upon real-time satellite imagery and model data, differential positive vorticity advection coincided with the left exit region of an upper-level jet streak which reached wind speeds of up to 130 kn (150 mph) (66.9 m/s (241 km/h)), thereby enhancing thunderstorm growth. Storms grew rapidly in height and extent, producing baseball-sized hail by 17:20 UTC in Illinois and, shortly thereafter, in St. Louis, Missouri, which reported a very severe thunderstorm early in the afternoon that, while not producing a tornado, was the costliest storm to hit the city up to that time. By 19:50 UTC, supercells producing F3 tornadoes hit the Decatur and Normal areas in Illinois. As thunderstorms moved into the warmer, moister air mass over eastern Illinois and Indiana, they produced longer-lived tornadoes—one of which began near Otterbein and ended near Valentine in Indiana, a distance of 121 miles (195 km).

Meanwhile, by 00:00 UTC the southern half of the first convective band became indistinguishable from new convection that had formed farther south over Alabama and Tennessee in connection with convective band two. In this area, increasing west-southwesterly wind shear at all levels of the troposphere, juxtaposed over near-parallel outflow boundaries, allowed successive supercells, all producing strong, long-tracked tornadoes, to develop unconstrained by their outflow in a broad region from eastern Mississippi to southern Tennessee. These storms, forming after 23:00 UTC, produced some of the most powerful tornadoes of the outbreak, including a large and long-tracked F4 that struck the western and central portions of Alabama, tracking for just over 110 miles (180 km), two F5s that both slammed into Tanner, causing extensive fatalities, an extremely potent F5 that devastated Guin in Alabama, and multiple violent, deadly tornadoes that affected and caused fatalities in Tennessee.

== Tornado summaries ==
=== Moulton-Trinity-Tanner, Alabama (First tornado) ===
Moulton-Trinity-Tanner, Alabama
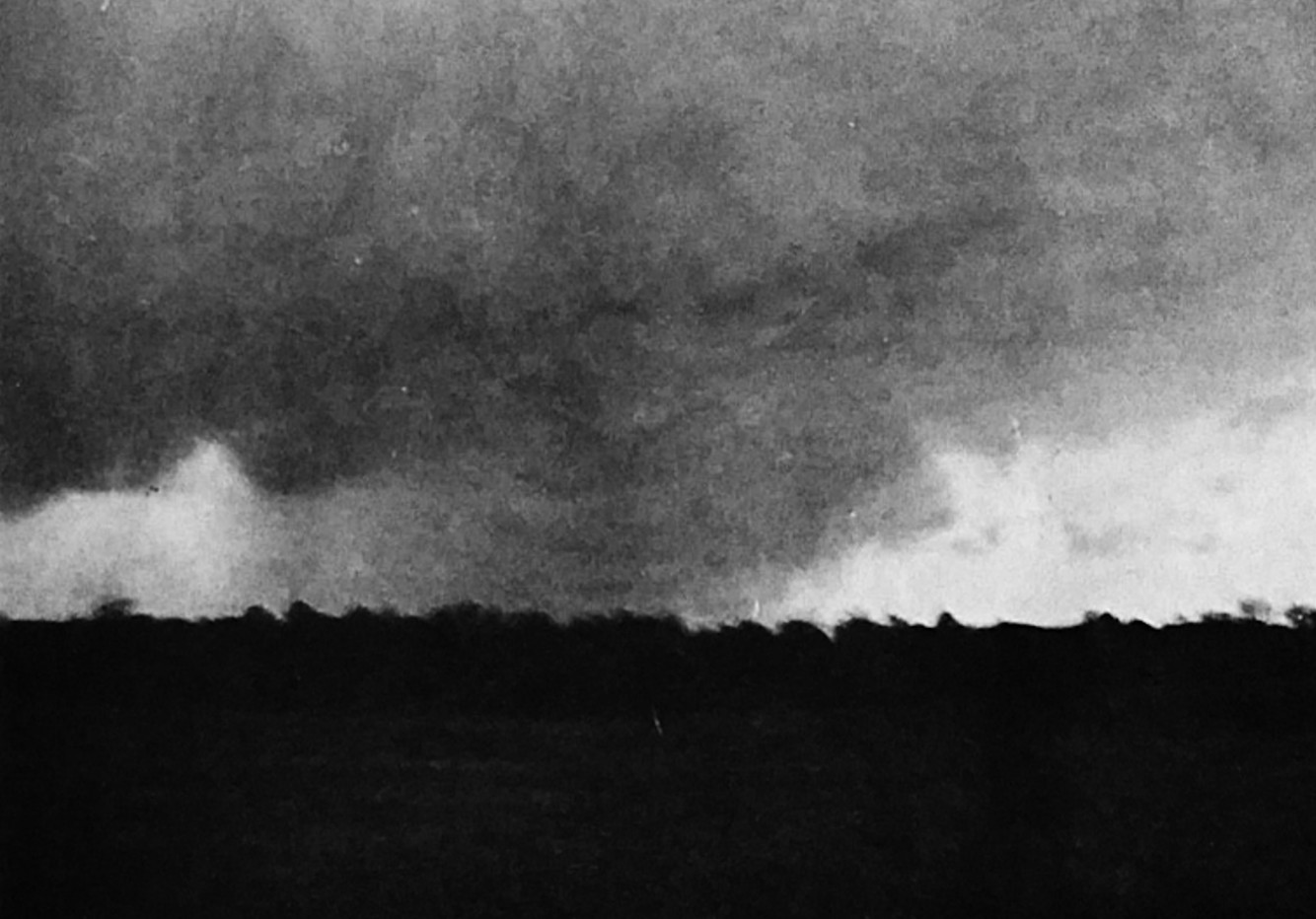
- The tornado, seen from Decatur

Meteorological history
- Formed: April 3, 6:15 p.m. CDT (UTC-5:00)
- Dissipated: April 3, 7:28 p.m. CDT (UTC-5:00)
- Duration: 1 hour 13 minutes

F5 tornado
- on the Fujita scale

Overall effects
- Casualties: 28 fatalities, 267 injuries

The first Tanner tornado formed at 6:15 pm CDT in Lawrence County, Alabama and ended 73 minutes later in Madison County, Alabama, killing 28 people. The tornado first touched down near the small community of Mt. Hope, and then tracked into Mt. Moriah, where the tornado rapidly intensified and swept away homes and hurled fleeing vehicles, and where a family of six were killed. Further along the track, many homes were swept away near Moulton. A water pump was completely lifted out of a wellhouse along SR 157 in this area. In one case, the destruction was so complete that a witness reported that the largest recognizable objects among scattered debris from an obliterated house were some bed-springs. The tornado crossed into Morgan County, causing additional destruction in rural areas near Hillsboro and Trinity.

Crossing the Tennessee River into Limestone County as a large waterspout, the tornado flattened a ¾-mile–wide swath of trees on the opposite bank. Ground scouring occurred in this area, as reddish soil was dug up and plastered against trees. The storm then slammed into Tanner, where many homes were swept away, vehicles were tossed, shrubbery was debarked, and Lawson's Trailer Park sustained major damage. The tornado then continued into Madison County and struck the Capshaw and Harvest areas. Numerous homes in Harvest and surrounding rural areas of the county were swept completely away and scattered, and extensive wind-rowing of debris was noted. A bathtub from one residence was found deeply embedded into the ground. Past Harvest, the tornado abruptly dissipated northeast of town, having a peak width of 500 yards.

=== Tanner-Harvest-Hazel Green, Alabama/Flintville, Tennessee (Second tornado) ===
Tanner-Harvest-Hazel Green, Alabama/Flintville, Tennessee
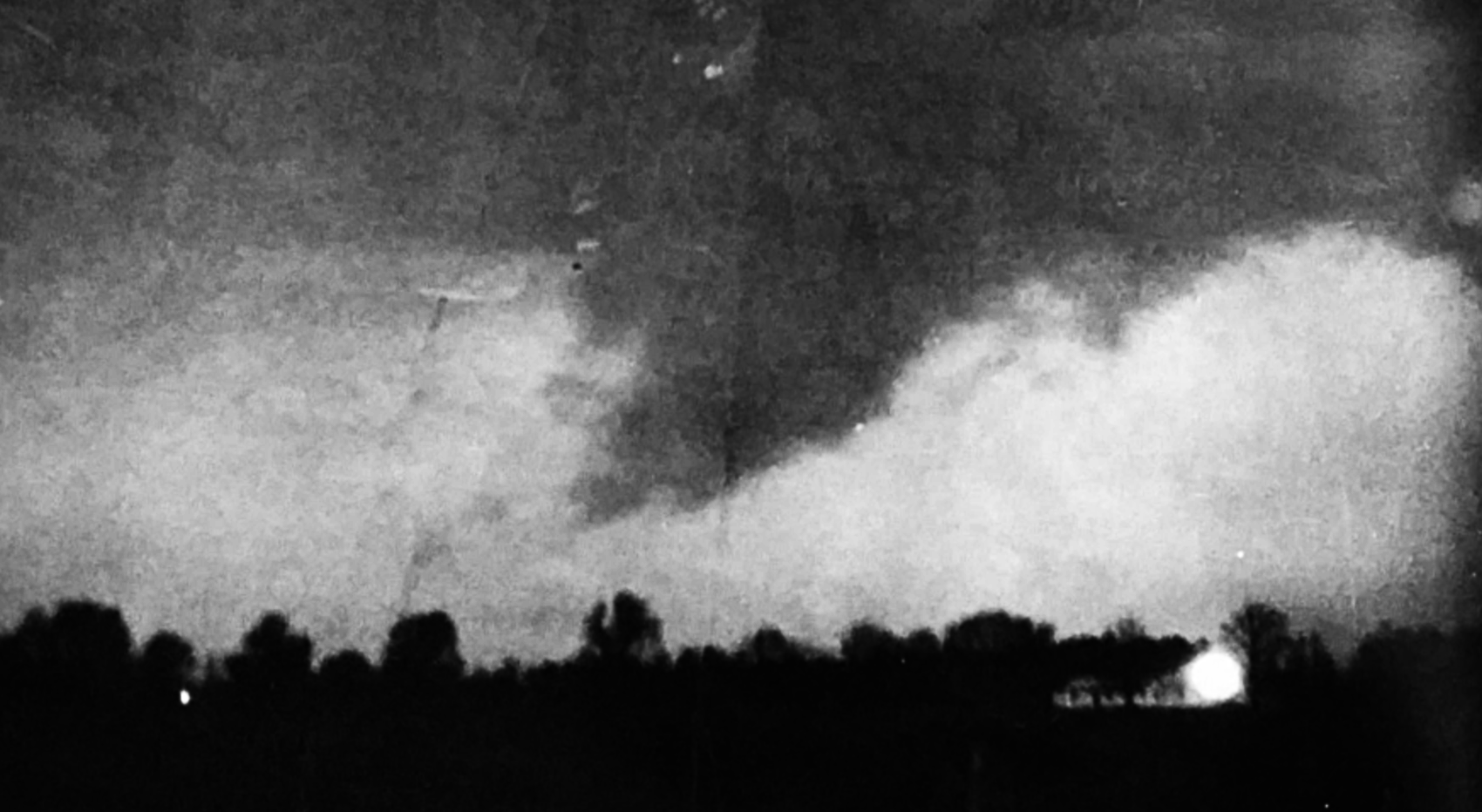
- The tornado near Harvest, Alabama

Meteorological history
- Formed: April 3, 7:35 p.m. CDT (UTC-5:00)
- Dissipated: April 3, 9:05 p.m. CDT) (UTC-5:00)
- Duration: 1 hour 30 minutes

F5 tornado
- on the Fujita scale

Overall effects
- Casualties: 16 fatalities, 190 injuries

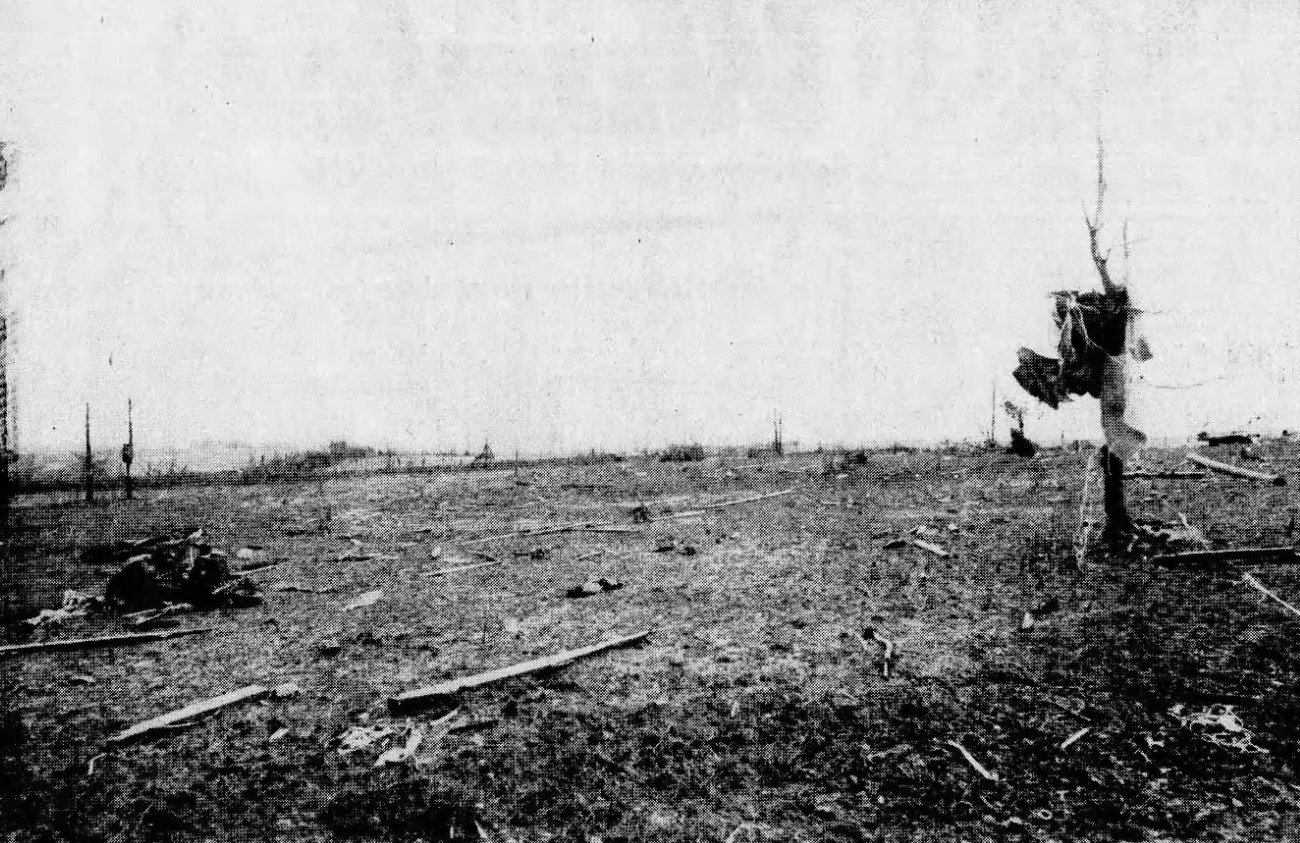
Violent tornado damage near Harvest, Alabama

While rescue efforts were underway to look for people under the destroyed structures, few were aware that another violent tornado would strike the area. The path of the second Tanner tornado, which formed at 7:35 pm CDT was 83 miles in length, also had a peak width of 500 yards, and the storm formed along the north bank Tennessee River less than a mile from the path of the earlier storm; with much of its path very closely paralleling its predecessor as it tore through Limestone and Madison Counties. 16 people were killed by this second tornado. Tanner was the first community to be hit, and many structures that were left standing after the first tornado were destroyed in the second one. A man injured at Lawson's Trailer Park in the first tornado was taken to a church in the area, which collapsed in the second tornado, killing him.

After devastating what was left of Tanner, the tornado continued across rural Limestone County and into Madison County, where the communities of Capshaw and Harvest were devastated once again. Numerous homes throughout Madison County were swept completely away, with extensive wind-rowing of debris noted once again. Past Harvest, the tornado swept away multiple additional homes in the Hazel Green area. The tornado continued northeastward through rural portions of Madison County before crossing into Tennessee, where major damage and 6 deaths occurred in Franklin and Lincoln Counties before the tornado dissipated in Coffee County. Two of the fatalities in Tennessee occurred when a church was destroyed during service.

== Aftermath ==
Several communities in northern Alabama, particularly Tanner and Harvest, were left in ruins after being hit both tornadoes. The second tornado would hinder rescue and recovery efforts in the immediate aftermath of the first tornado. Over half of all fatalities in Alabama on April 3 were the direct result of both tornadoes, and the vast majority of injuries in Alabama were also caused by these tornadoes.

Both tornadoes would receive a rating of F5 on the Fujita scale, and were two of seven tornadoes during the 1974 Super Outbreak to receive that rating and of eight to touch down statewide in Alabama.

== See also ==
- 2011 Hackleburg–Phil Campbell tornado, an EF5 tornado that would hit Tanner and Harvest over 37 years later
