= 1974 Brandenburg tornado =

F5 tornado in 1974

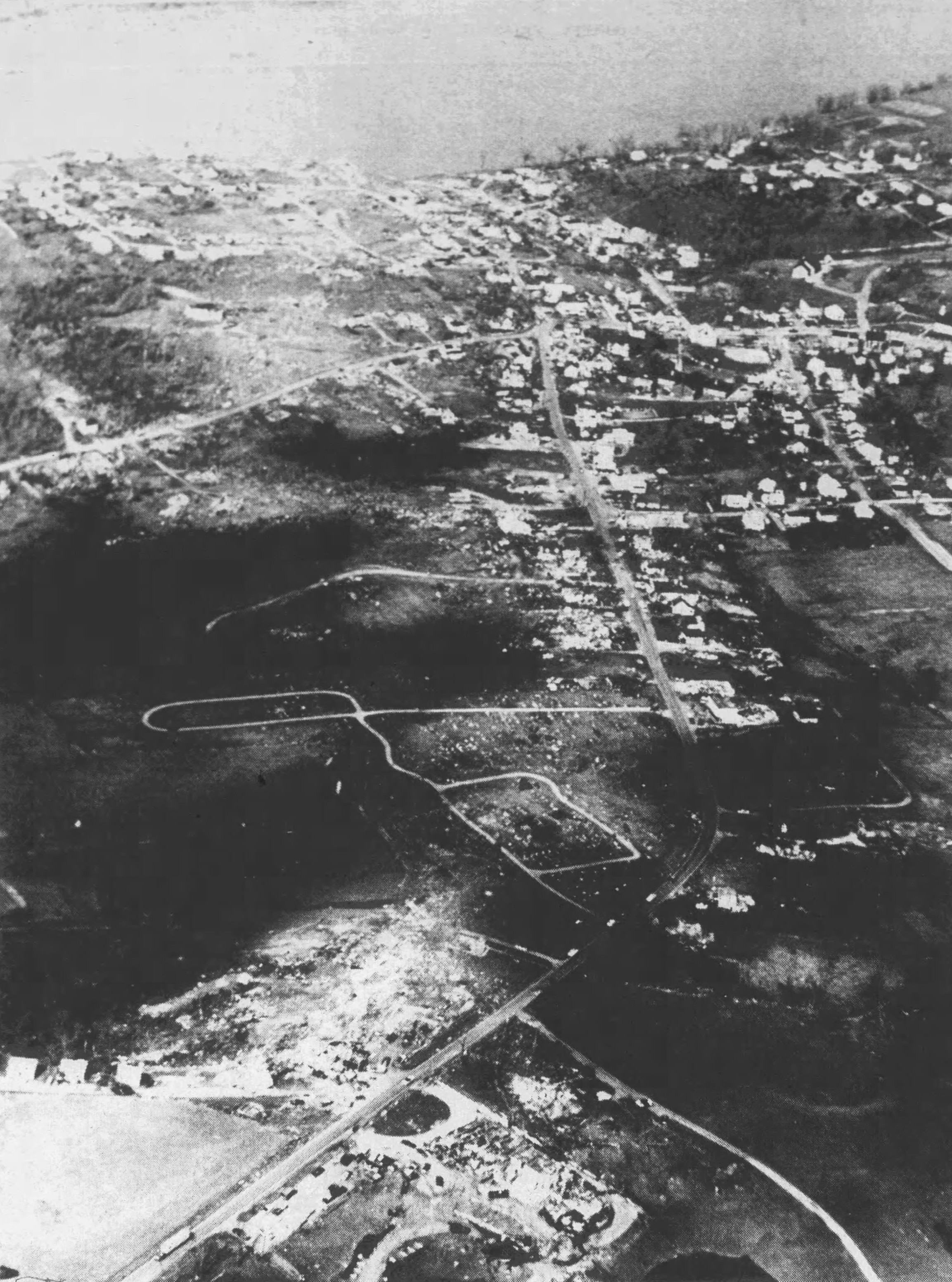
- An aerial photograph showing the tornado's track through Brandenburg.

Meteorological history
- Date: April 3, 1974
- Formed: 3:25 p.m. CDT (UTC-5:00)
- Dissipated: 4:17 p.m. CDT (UTC-5:00)
- Duration: 52 minutes

F5 tornado
- on the Fujita scale
- Highest winds: >261 mph (420 km/h)

Overall effects
- Fatalities: 31
- Injuries: 257
- Damage: $2.5 million (1974 USD)
- Part of the 1974 Super Outbreak and Tornadoes of 1974

The 1974 Brandenburg tornado was a large and destructive tornado that moved through Central Kentucky and southern Indiana, striking several communities along a 32 miles (51 km) path and devastating the town of Brandenburg, Kentucky, during the afternoon hours of April 3, 1974. The tornado would kill thirty-one people, twenty-eight in the Brandenburg area, and would produce damage that would later receive a rating of F5 on the Fujita scale. It was one of seven F5-rated tornadoes to touch down in the United States on April 3, and was one of the deadliest.

== Meteorological synopsis ==
By 12:00 UTC on April 3, a large-scale trough extended over most of the contiguous United States, with several modest shortwaves rotating around the broad base of the trough. The mid-latitude low-pressure center over Kansas continued to deepen to 980 mb (28.94 inHg), and wind speeds at the 850-mb level increased to 50 kn (58 mph) (25.7 m/s (93 km/h)) over portions of Louisiana, Mississippi, and Alabama. Due to significant moisture advection, destabilization rapidly proceeded apace; the warm front near the Gulf Coast dissipated and then redeveloped northward over the Ohio River valley. Consequently, CAPE levels in the region rose to 1,000 J/kg. However, a warm temperature plume in the elevated mixed layer kept thunderstorms from initiating at the surface. Meanwhile, a large mesoscale convective system (MCS) that had developed overnight in Arkansas continued to strengthen due to strong environmental lapse rates. Later in the day, strong daytime heating caused instability to further rise. By 18:00 UTC, CAPE values in excess of 2,500 J/kg were present over the lower Ohio and the Mississippi Valley. As wind speeds in the troposphere increased, large-scale lifting overspread the warm sector. At the same time, the forward-propagating MCS spread into the Tennessee and Ohio valleys, where it evolved into the first of three main convection bands that produced tornadoes. This first convective band moved rapidly northeast, at times reaching speeds of about 60 kn (69 mph) (30.9 m/s (111 km/h)). However, thunderstorm activity, for the moment, remained mostly elevated in nature.

By 16:30 UTC, the large MCS began to splinter into two sections: the southern part slowed, lagging into southeast Tennessee, while the northern part accelerated, reaching Pennsylvania by 19:30 UTC. The split was related to several factors, including a band of subsidence over eastern Kentucky and western West Virginia; local downslope winds over the Appalachians; and an inversion over the same area. These factors allowed the northern part of the MCS to accelerate due to efficient ducting, while the southern part slowed as the boundary layer warmed and moistened. Numerous surface-based supercells began to develop in the southern area, beginning with one that produced an F3 tornado at about 16:30 UTC near Cleveland, Tennessee. Meanwhile, a new band of scattered thunderstorms developed at 15:00 UTC over eastern Arkansas and Missouri; over the next four hours, this band became the focus for several intense supercells, starting in eastern Illinois and southern Indiana. In the wake of the MCS, backing low-level winds, rapid diurnal destabilization, and perhaps cool, mid-level advection had occurred over the warm sector, weakening the convective inhibition (CINH) layer, and favorable wind profiles bolstered helicity to over 230 m^{2}/s^{2}—a combination of factors conducive to tornadogenesis. Consequently, the storms increased in intensity and coverage as they moved into Illinois, Indiana, and northern Kentucky, producing several tornadoes, including the first F5 tornado of the day, at 19:20 UTC, near Depauw, Indiana. Several of the storms to form between 19:20 and 20:20 UTC became significant, long-lived supercells, producing many strong or violent tornadoes, including three F5s at Depauw, Xenia, Ohio, and Brandenburg.

== Tornado summary ==
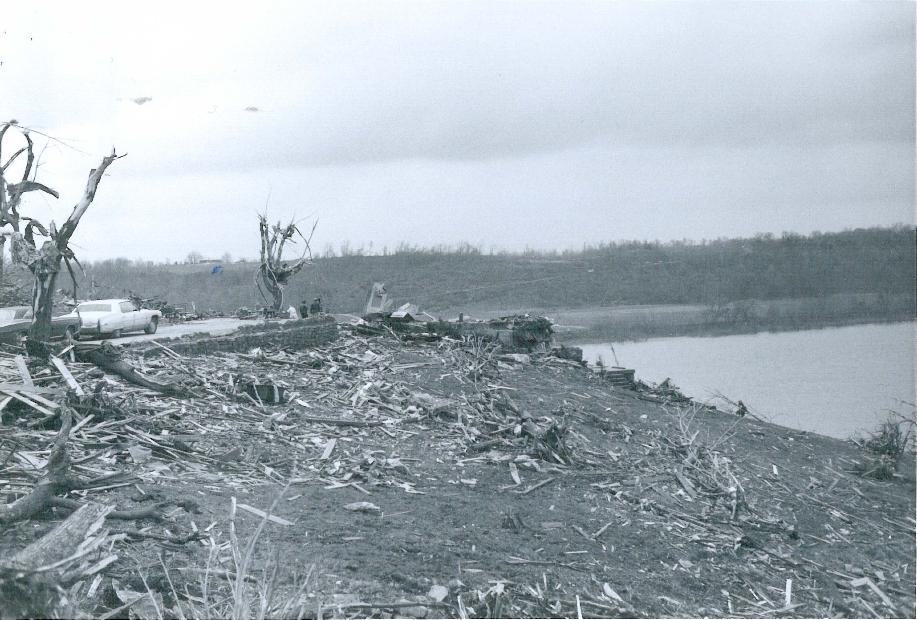
Remains of a house that was completely swept away in Brandenburg, with heavily debarked trees and shrubbery in the foreground.

The Brandenburg tornado, which produced F5 damage and took 31 lives, touched down in Breckinridge County around 3:25 pm CDT and followed a 32-mile (51 km) path. The tornado first moved across the north edge of Hardinsburg, inflicting F3 damage to homes at that location. The tornado quickly became violent as it moved into Meade County, producing F4 damage as it passed north of Irvington, sweeping away numerous homes in this rural area. Vehicles were thrown hundreds of yards from residences and mangled, and a few were completely wrapped around trees. One home that was swept away sustained total collapse of a poured concrete walk-out basement wall. A news photographer reported that the tornado "left no grass" as it crossed KY 79 in this area, and canceled checks from near Irvington were later found in Ohio. Past Irvington, the tornado tore directly through Brandenburg at F5 intensity, completely leveling and sweeping away numerous homes, some of which were well-built and anchor-bolted. The town's downtown area was also devastated with 18 of the fatalities occurring along Green Street alone. Trees and shrubbery in town were debarked and stripped, extensive wind-rowing of debris occurred, and numerous vehicles were destroyed as well, some of which had nothing left but the frame and tires. A curtain rod was found speared deeply into the trunk of one tree in town. Several tombstones in the Cap Anderson cemetery were toppled and broken, and some were displaced a small distance. Exiting Brandenburg, the tornado crossed into Indiana producing F4 damage there before dissipating. The same storm would later produce tornadoes in the Louisville metro area.

== Aftermath ==
=== Fatalities ===
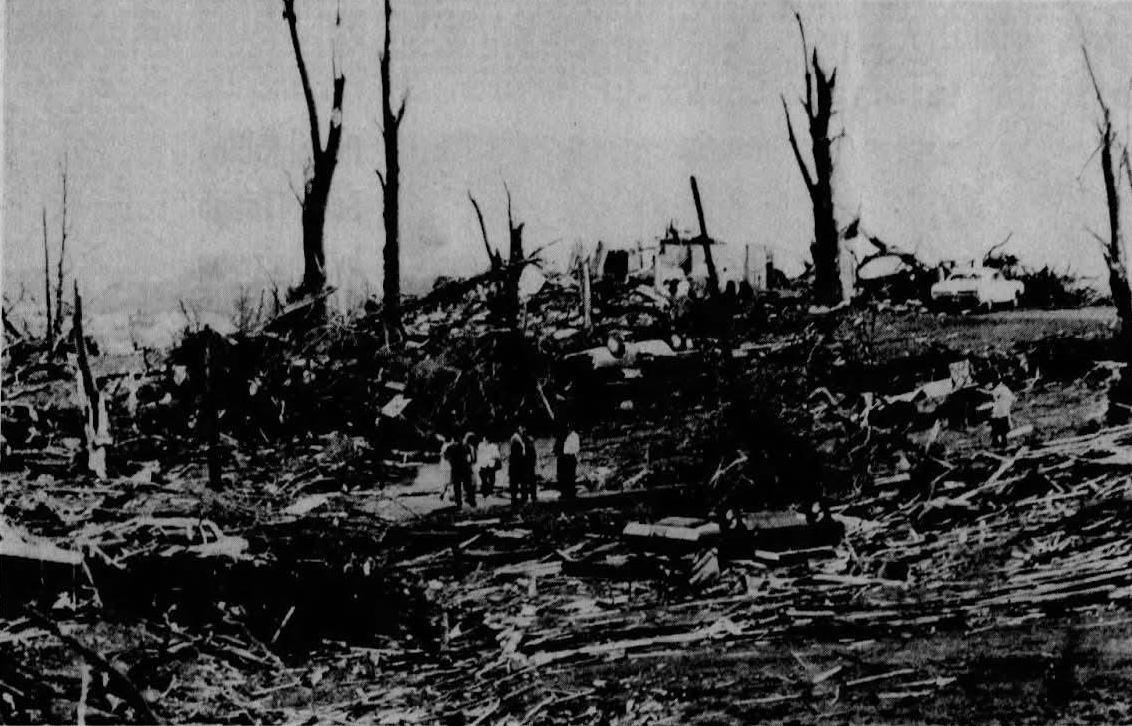
Devastation in Brandenburg.

Thirty-one people would be killed by the tornado as it moved through central Kentucky. Eighteen of these fatalities would occur along Green Street, located in Brandenburg. Over 120 homes and other buildings were destroyed in Brandenburg, and damage in the town would later receive an F5 rating. The tornado was the first to touch down in Kentucky on April 3, and was the most destructive. Across the entire state, 6,625 families had damaged property and between 1,800 and 2,000 of the state's farms incurred damage.

When the tornado struck on April 3, many of the residents of Brandenburg at the time had also experienced a major flood of the Ohio River that affected the area in 1937 as well as numerous other communities along the river, including Louisville and Paducah. The Brandenburg tornado is the only tornado to have officially produced documented F5/EF5 damage in the state of Kentucky, with the 1971 Gosser Ridge, Kentucky tornado being rated F5 by the National Oceanic and Atmospheric Administration and the Nuclear Regulatory Commission, before being downgraded to F4 after 2000.

== See also ==
- 1974 Xenia tornado, another F5 tornado that would touch down on the same day
- 1974 Guin tornado, another extremely violent F5 from this day
