= Tornado outbreak of April 1–2, 1974 =

Weather event in the United States

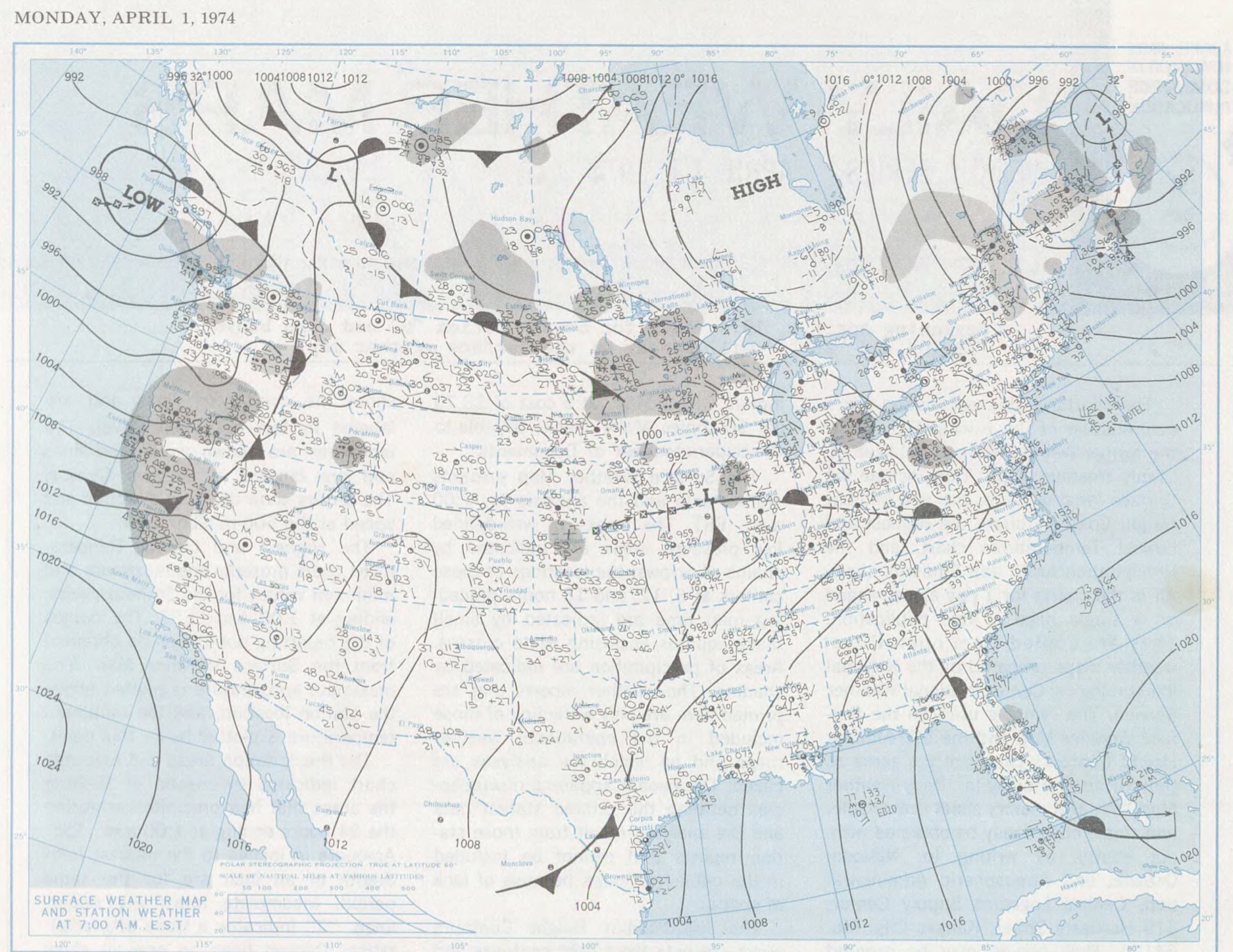
- Weather map on April 1, that shows the low-pressure area over the Midwestern U.S. that produced the tornado outbreak

Meteorological history
- Formed: April 1, 1974
- Dissipated: April 2, 1974
- Duration: 10 hours, 43 minutes

Tornado outbreak
- Tornadoes: 23
- Max. rating: F3 tornado
- Highest winds: Non-tornadic – 69 mph (111 km/h) in Daviess County, Kentucky
- Largest hail: 3 in (7.6 cm) in Washington County, Mississippi

Overall effects
- Fatalities: 4
- Injuries: 72
- Damage: >$3.65 million (1974 USD)
- Areas affected: Midwestern, Eastern, and Southern United States
- Part of the tornado outbreaks of 1974

The tornado outbreak of April 1–2, 1974 was a tornado outbreak that affected much of the eastern and central United States on April 1–2, 1974. Four fatalities and more than seventy injuries were confirmed in this outbreak. Damaging, deadly tornadoes struck Kentucky, Tennessee, and Alabama—including the Nashville and Huntsville metropolitan areas. In the latter areas, tornadoes produced F3 damage on the Fujita scale and impacted areas that would later sustain damage on April 3. Large hail and severe thunderstorm winds also impacted a broad area. It was widely seen as a prelude to the 1974 Super Outbreak less than 48 hours later from a separate storm system.

== Background ==
The outbreak began when a powerful area of low pressure formed across the Great Plains on April 1 and moved into Mississippi and Ohio Valleys. As it did, a surge of very moist warm air intensified the storm. As a result, a series of tornado outbreaks occurred. The outbreak produced 23 confirmed tornadoes, three of which caused at least one fatality. (Note: Numbers for early outbreaks are likely underestimated, due in part to limited human and technological monitors. More complete documentation began in the 1990s, when NEXRAD premiered and the National Weather Service systemized detailed storm surveys.) The outbreak ended approximately 30 hours before the Super Outbreak of 1974 began. The National Weather Service (NWS) issued a total of 11 severe weather watches on April 1 alone. These watches, along with the damage and deaths that followed, prompted alertness among the general public that may have reduced casualties and losses during the larger outbreak of April 3 to April 4. According to the NWS, the severe weather on April 1 spurred appropriate protective measures a few days later, and consequently "many lives were saved."

== Confirmed tornadoes ==
Confirmed tornadoes by Fujita rating
FU	F0	F1	F2	F3	F4	F5	Total
0	2	8	10	3	0	0	23

Daily statistics of tornadoes produced by the tornado outbreak of April 1–2, 1974 (Note: All losses are in 1974 USD unless otherwise noted.)
Date	Total	Fujita scale rating						Deaths	Injuries	Damage	Ref.
Date	Total	F0	F1	F2	F3	F4	F5	Deaths	Injuries	Damage	Ref.
April 1	19	2	5	9	3	0	0	3	62	>$3,650,000	
April 2	4	0	3	1	0	0	0	1	10	—N/a	
Total	23	2	8	10	3	0	0	4	72	>$3,650,000	

List of known tornadoes during the tornado outbreak of April 1–2, 1974 (Note: Coordinates, if any, derived from the Storm Events Database.) (Note: All dates are based on the local time zone where the tornado touched down; however, all times are in Coordinated Universal Time for consistency.)
F#	Location	County / Parish	State	Start coord.	Date	Time (UTC)	Path length	Max width	Summary
F2	NNE of Merigold	Bolivar	MS	33.85°N 90.72°W	April 1	2110	0.1 miles (0.16 km)	—N/a	The first tornado of the outbreak briefly touched down, causing moderate damage to structures in or near Merigold. The tornado wrecked a trailer and damaged twenty-five residences. A boxcar fell off its track, and a hangar sustained damage.
F1	SSE of Grubbs	Jackson	AR	35.63°N 91.07°W	April 1	2136	0.3 miles (0.48 km)	—N/a	A short-lived tornado struck a manufacturing plant, causing substantial damage to roofs and mobile structures.
F3	ENE of Bridgeport to N of Lawrenceville	Lawrence	IL	38.72°N 87.73°W	April 1	2217	3.3 miles (5.3 km)	—N/a	This was the first of three intense tornadoes to form during the outbreak. A storage for school buses sustained damage, as did trees, residences, and power lines. The tornado also damaged a few mobile homes. A reanalysis by Thomas P. Grazulis did not list this tornado as significant (F2 or stronger on the Fujita scale).
F2	Lafayette	Tippecanoe	IN	40.42°N 86.87°W	April 1	2232	1.5 miles (2.4 km)	—N/a	A strong tornado touched down in downtown Lafayette, severely damaging a lumber yard. A mobile home and several garages were leveled. Additionally, one home had its roof torn off, and several windows were smashed.
F2	ENE of Zion to ENE of Samantha	Tuscaloosa	AL	33.43°N 87.83°W	April 1	2305	16.3 miles (26.2 km)	—N/a	A tornado affected Moores Bridge and surrounding environs, damaging an expansive area. Six people sustained non-life-threatening injuries. Grazulis did not list this tornado as an F2 or stronger.
F1	NNW of Bronson to Coldwater	Branch	MI	41.90°N 85.20°W	April 1	2350	10.6 miles (17.1 km)	—N/a	A tornado produced sporadic damage at several scattered points. Two homes and several farm buildings sustained damage. Winds wrecked the uppermost floor of a two-story structure in Coldwater.
F2	WNW of Raysville	Henry	IN	39.80°N 85.52°W	April 1	2355	1 mile (1.6 km)	—N/a	A short-lived tornado toppled a tree onto and destroyed a vehicle. A nearby farm also sustained damage. Grazulis did not list this tornado as an F2 or stronger.
F2	NW of Jefferson	Carroll	MS	33.67°N 89.92°W	April 1	0000	0.1 miles (0.16 km)	—N/a	A brief tornado struck the "Ebenezer" community, damaging several homes, one of which was destroyed.
F0	SSW of Richmond	Madison	LA	32.33°N 91.20°W	April 1	0020	0.1 miles (0.16 km)	—N/a	A very weak, brief touchdown produced little damage.
F3	Campbellsburg area	Henry	KY	38.50°N 85.23°W	April 1	0020	3.3 miles (5.3 km)	—N/a	1 death – A powerful, large thunderstorm generated an intense tornado in Henry County. The tornado severely damaged Campbellsburg, leaving one-fifth of the population homeless. More than forty homes and businesses were badly damaged or destroyed. The tornado killed one person in a mobile home. Grazulis considered the damage to be F2 rather than F3 in intensity. Twenty injuries occurred along the relatively short path.
F1	SE of Sandy Hook	Elliott	KY	38.08°N 83.12°W	April 1	0030	2 miles (3.2 km)	—N/a	A tornado struck the Sandy Hook area, causing extensive damage. It damaged or destroyed many barns, garages, other structures, and a gas station. The tornado leveled six trailers and affected forty barns. Three people sustained injuries. Grazulis assigned an F2 rating to the tornado, based on the severity of the damage it produced.
F1	Dickson area	Dickson	TN	36.08°N 87.40°W	April 1	0045	2 miles (3.2 km)	—N/a	A short-tracked tornado struck warehouse structures and a supermarket, causing extensive but minor damage.
F0	Greenville area	Darke	OH	40.10°N 84.63°W	April 1	0050	0.2 miles (0.32 km)	—N/a	A brief touchdown caused minimal damage to a property. A television antenna, a garage, and a fence sustained damage.
F2	NNE of Belle Meade to ENE of Downtown Nashville	Davidson	TN	36.12°N 86.85°W	April 1	0110	10.9 miles (17.5 km)	—N/a	1 death – A strong tornado tracked through Nashville, doing over $3.6 million in damage. Most of the losses occurred at a pair of shopping centers, where losses reached $1 million, and at an apartment complex. The complex, which contained seventy units, received $100,000 in damage. The tornado also passed over Nashville International Airport, where it wrecked twelve airplanes. Authorities reported $2.5 million in damage to the airport. In all, the tornado damaged seventy-two residences and tore off roofs. The tornado injured twelve people. Operationally, the NWS reported two fatalities, not one, and both may have been lighting- rather than tornado-related.
F2	WNW of Durant	Holmes	MS	33.10°N 89.90°W	April 1	0140	0.1 miles (0.16 km)	—N/a	A tornado briefly touched down, moderately damaging thirteen to fifteen buildings. Three of the structures were mobile homes. Grazulis did not assess this tornado to be F2 or stronger.
F1	W of Mount Juliet to NW of Lebanon	Wilson	TN	36.20°N 86.53°W	April 1	0145	13.1 miles (21.1 km)	—N/a	A tornado caused widespread damage to homes and to a local high school. The roof at the school received substantial damage. The tornado also struck trees and power lines in its path. Total losses from Mount Juliet and Lebanon reached $1.05 million. Preliminary reports indicated six injuries, but this total was later reduced to four in the finalized data.
F2	SSE of Calhoun City	Calhoun	MS	33.80°N 89.30°W	April 1	0145	5.1 miles (8.2 km)	—N/a	A strong tornado produced patchy damage to outbuildings and barns. Additionally, the tornado damaged two homes, one of which was a mobile home. Several cotton wagons were wrecked as well. Grazulis did not consider the tornado to be F2 or stronger.
F2	SW of Hayden to Oneonta	Blount	AL	33.88°N 86.77°W	April 1	0330	16.9 miles (27.2 km)	—N/a	A tornado produced intermittent damage as it skipped across part of Blount County. Most of the damage was reported from the Hayden area, but additional damage occurred at a mobile home park near Oneonta. The tornado leveled sixteen residences, thirteen of which were trailers. Eleven other structures, all homes and trailers, sustained damage. Eleven people were injured.
F3	E of Madison to NNE of Downtown Huntsville	Madison	AL	34.70°N 86.72°W	April 1	0340	8.4 miles (13.5 km)	—N/a	1 death – A powerful nighttime tornado struck the northern edge of Huntsville. The tornado produced its most severe impact to the Sherwood Park subdivision on the northern outskirts of Huntsville. There, winds tore off roofs and caused some walls to collapse. Grazulis assigned an F2 rating to this damage, rather than the official F3 ranking. The fatality occurred in a mobile home; seven other occupants did not sustain injuries. The tornado injured six people.
F1	S of Murphy to NE of Andrews	Cherokee	NC	35.07°N 84.03°W	April 2	0601	16.8 miles (27.0 km)	—N/a	A tornado generated isolated damage as it skipped along. There were no injuries or fatalities.
F2	WNW of Lanett	Chambers	AL	32.88°N 85.23°W	April 2	0700	0.1 miles (0.16 km)	—N/a	A strong tornado traversed forested areas without affecting structures.
F1	W of McNeill	Pearl River	MS	30.67°N 89.68°W	April 2	0732	0.1 miles (0.16 km)	—N/a	Outbuildings on farms sustained damage, in addition to a few homes.
F1	NW of Tryon to E of Hardins	Gaston	NC	35.35°N 81.33°W	April 2	0753	9.7 miles (15.6 km)	—N/a	1 death – A tornado produced scattered damage near Cherryville, damaging several mobile homes. The tornado wrecked fifteen mobile homes in the area. One person died as the tornado destroyed her mobile home. A nearby house also lost its roof. Grazulis assigned an F2 rating to the damage, rather than the official F1 ranking. Ten people sustained injuries, primarily in mobile homes.

== Non-tornadic effects ==
Peak wind gusts reached 69 mph (111 km/h) in the strongest thunderstorms, over Daviess County, Kentucky. The largest hailstones peaked at 3 in (7.6 cm) in circumference, as measured in Washington County, Mississippi.

== See also ==
- 1974 Super Outbreak – Second largest outbreak in American history, after the 2011 Super Outbreak
- List of tornadoes and tornado outbreaks
  - List of North American tornadoes and tornado outbreaks
- Tornadoes of 1974
