= Tornadoes of 1974 =

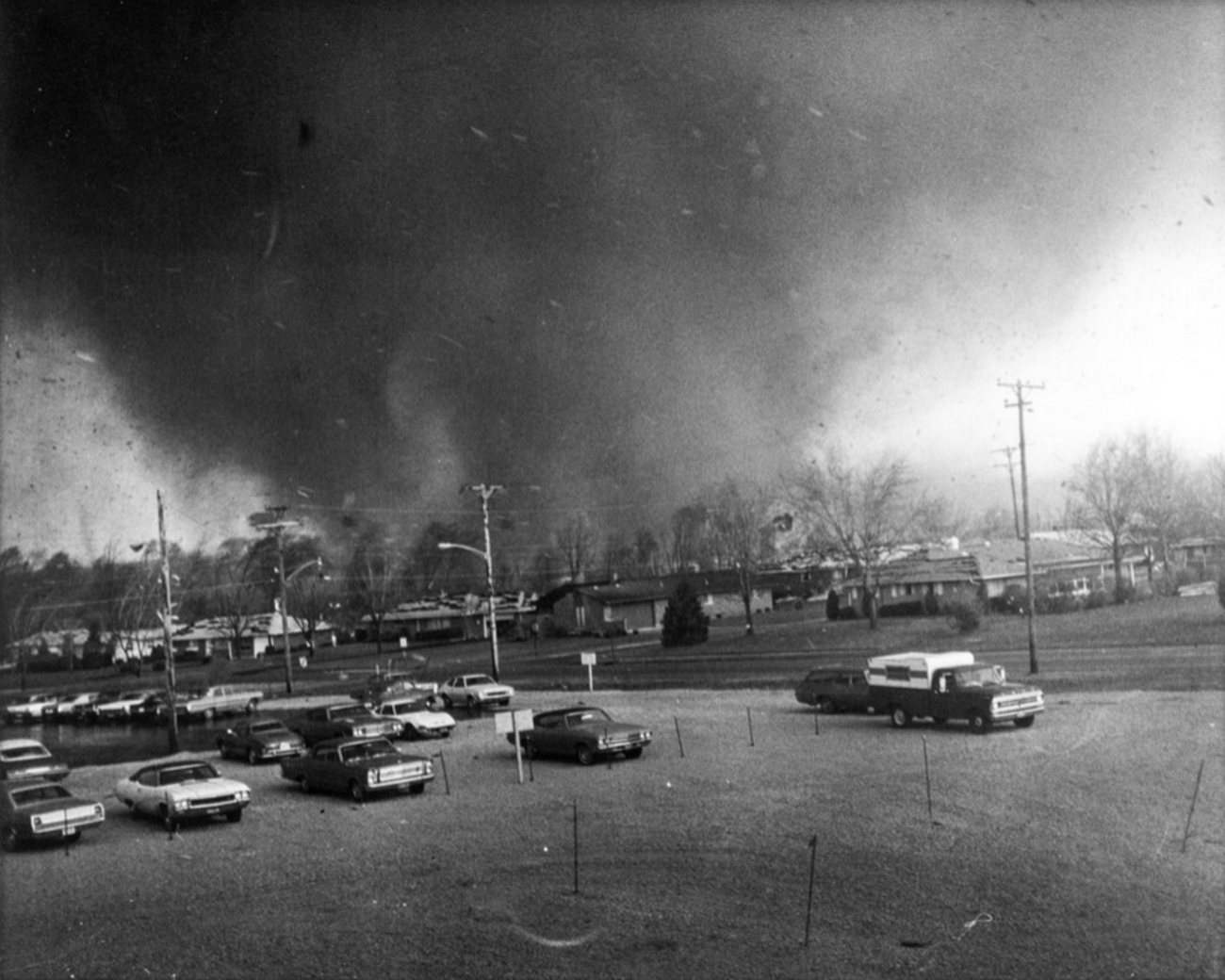
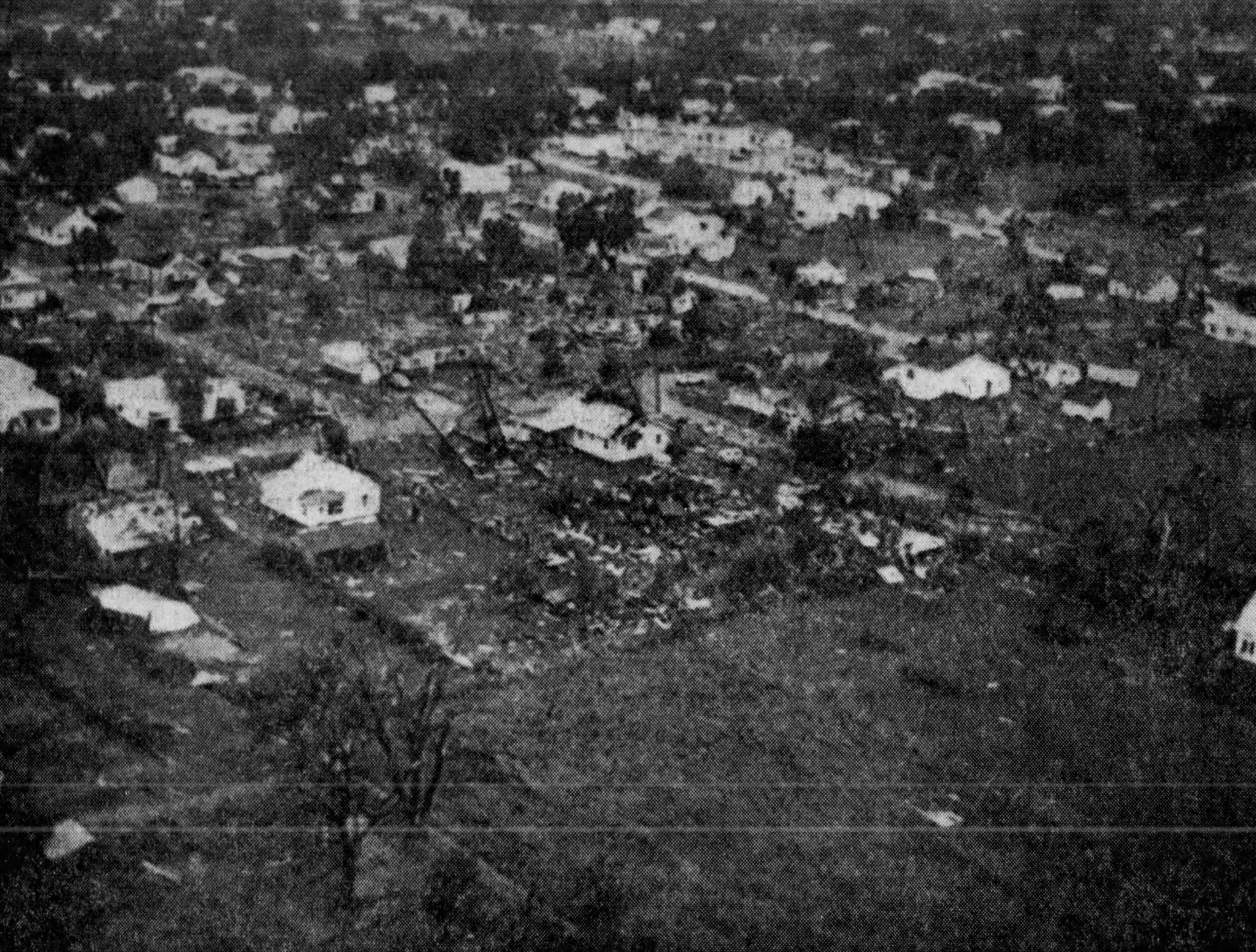
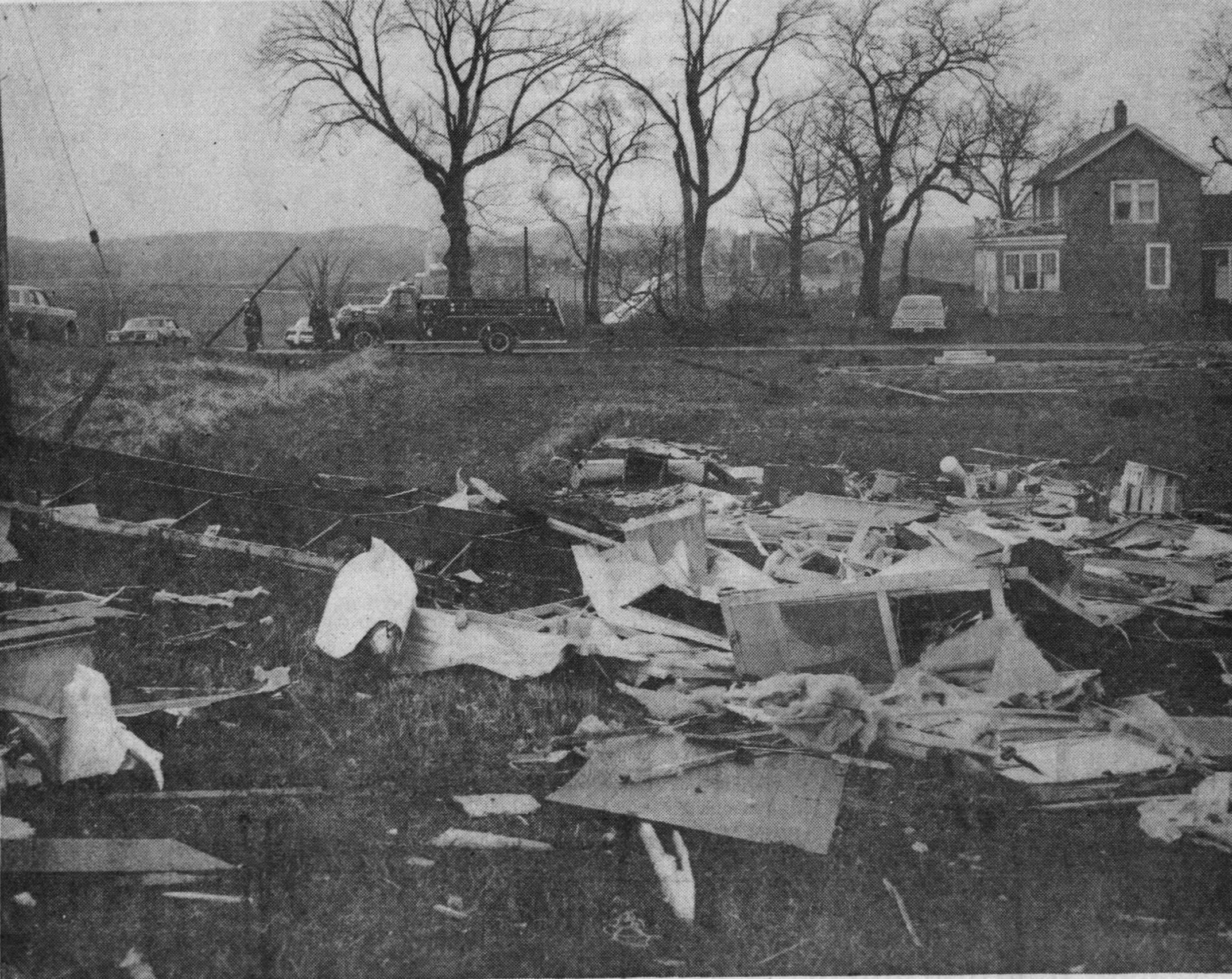
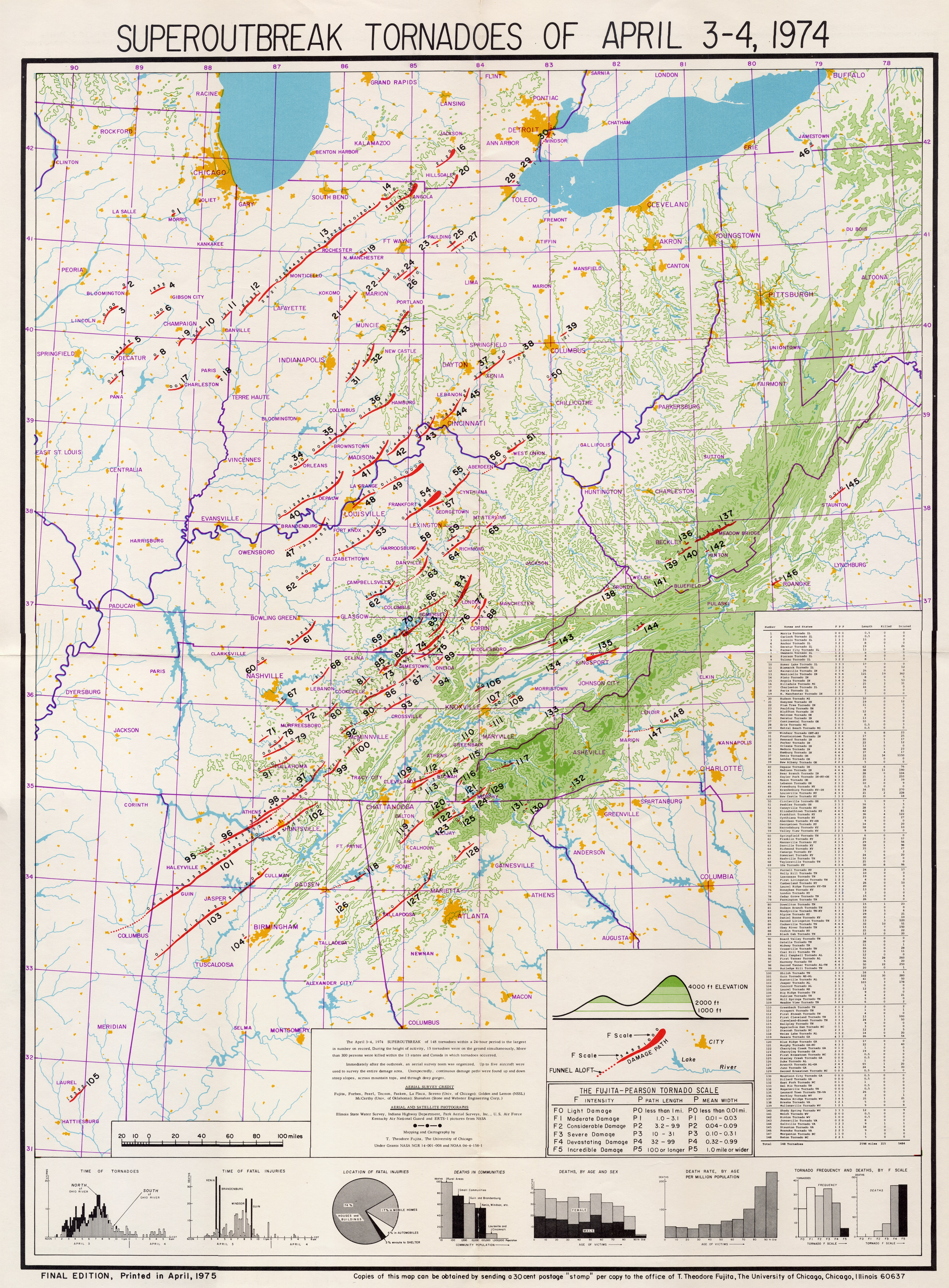
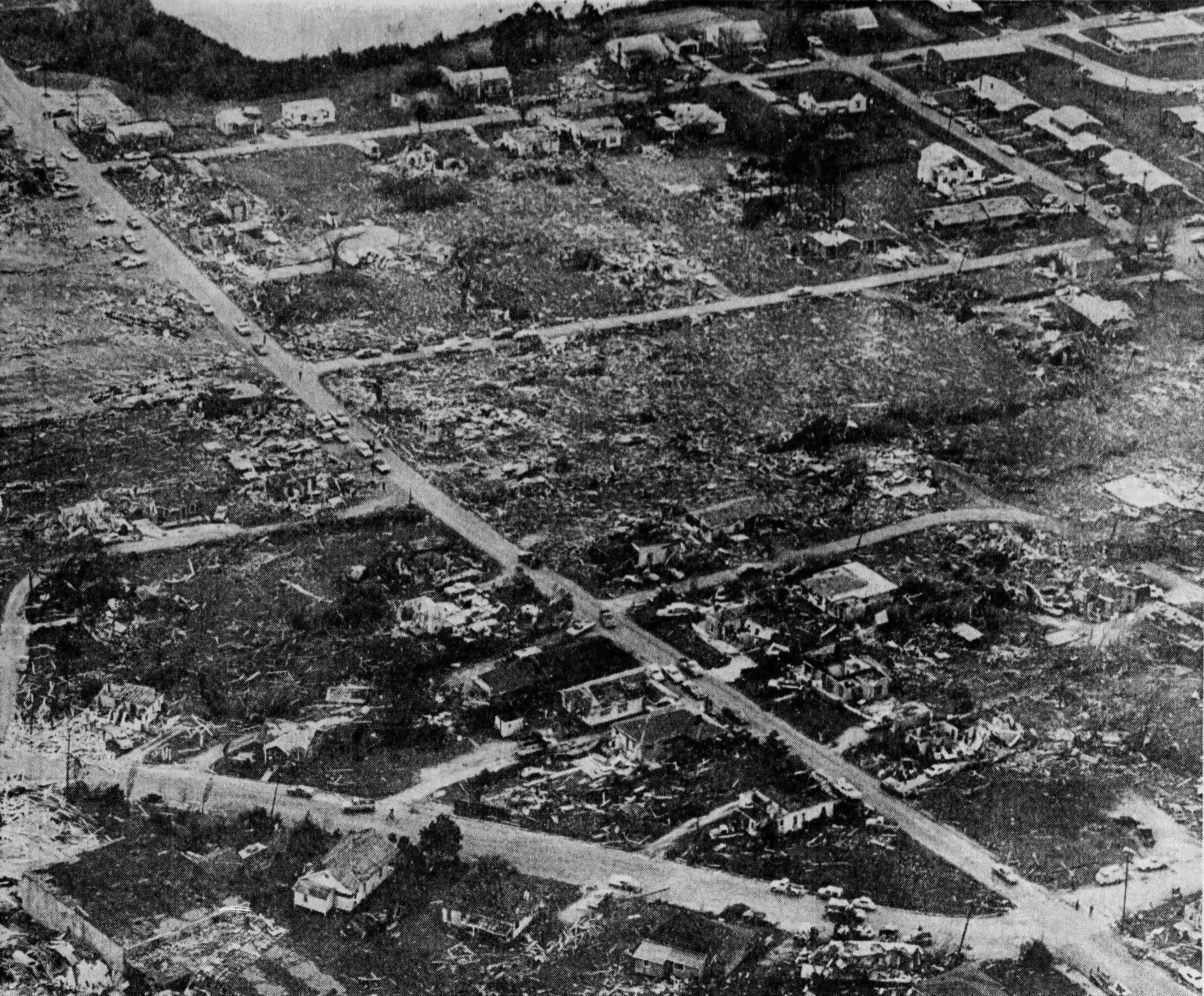
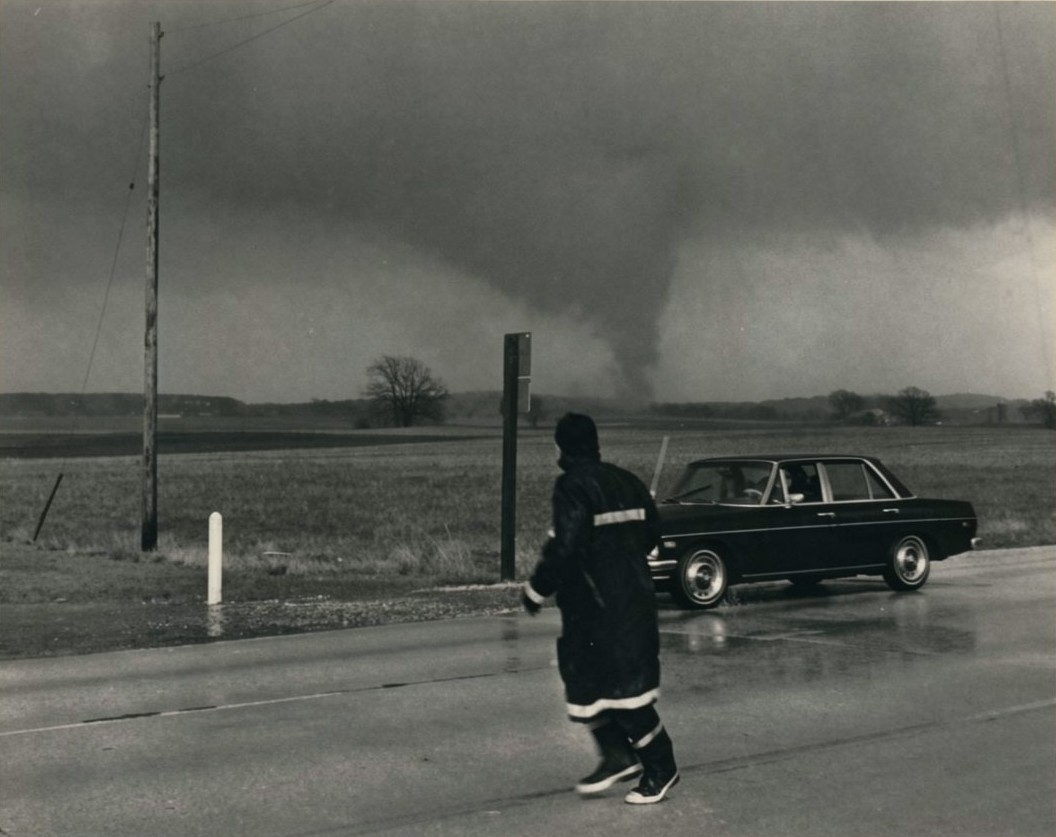
- Clockwise from top: An F5 tornado going through the southeast Pinecrest Garden district of Xenia, Ohio on April 3; A mobile home that was destroyed by an F3 tornado near Eden, Wisconsin on April 21; Downtown Guin, Alabama after an F5 tornado on April 3; A multi-vortex tornado shortly after formation north of Lomira, Wisconsin on April 21; Ted Fujita's full analysis map of the 1974 Super Outbreak which occurred on April 3; An aerial view of Drumright, Oklahoma after an F4 tornado on June 8.
- Timespan: January 11 - December 25, 1974
Maximum rated tornado
F5 tornado
- List
  – Depauw, Indiana
  on April 3
  – Xenia, Ohio
  on April 3
  – Brandenburg, Kentucky
  on April 3
  – Sayler Park, Ohio
  on April 3
  – Tanner, Alabama
  on April 3
  – Tanner, Alabama
  on April 3
  – Guin, Alabama
  on April 3
- Tornadoes in U.S.: 945
- Damage (U.S.): Unknown
- Fatalities (U.S.): 366
- Fatalities (worldwide): ≥366

This page documents the tornadoes and tornado outbreaks of 1974, primarily in the United States. Most tornadoes form in the U.S., although some events may take place internationally. Tornado statistics for older years like this often appear significantly lower than modern years due to fewer reports or confirmed tornadoes.

== Synopsis ==
Fatal United States tornadoes in 1974
- Approximate touchdown location of killer tornadoes in 1974
Summary of tornadoes
- January 26 – Alabama (1 death)
- January 30 – Florida (1 death)
- March 20 – Texas, Louisiana (1 death)
- April 1 – Kentucky (1 death)
- April 1 – Tennessee (1 death)
- April 1 – Alabama (1 death)
- April 2 – North Carolina (1 death)
- April 3 – Tennessee (1 death)
- April 3 – Indiana (6 deaths)
- April 3 – Ohio (36 deaths)
- April 3 – Indiana (1 death)
- April 3 – Illinois (1 death)
- April 3 – Indiana (1 death)
- April 3 – Indiana (4 deaths)
- April 3 – Indiana (11 deaths)
- April 3 – Kentucky, Indiana (31 deaths)
- April 3 – Tennessee (1 death)
- April 3 – Indiana (1 death)
- April 3 – Illinois (1 death)
- April 3 – Indiana, Kentucky, Ohio (3 deaths)
- April 3 – Ohio (2 deaths)
- April 3 – Kentucky (3 deaths)
- April 3 – Indiana (18 deaths)
- April 3 – Kentucky (3 deaths)
- April 3 – Kentucky (3 deaths)
- April 3 – Tennessee (3 deaths)
- April 3 – Georgia (9 deaths)
- April 3 – Kentucky (4 deaths)
- April 3 – Alabama, Georgia (1 death)
- April 3 – Alabama (28 deaths)
- April 3 – Kentucky (1 death)
- April 3 – Alabama (3 deaths)
- April 3 – Kentucky (10 deaths)
- April 3 – Indiana (5 deaths)
- April 3 – Ohio (1 death)
- April 3 – North Carolina (2 deaths)
- April 3 – Kentucky (7 deaths)
- April 3 – Georgia (6 deaths)
- April 3 – Tennessee (1 death)
- April 3 – Alabama, Tennessee (16 deaths)
- April 3 – Michigan (2 deaths)
- April 3 – Tennessee (11 deaths)
- April 3 – Kentucky (7 deaths)
- April 3 – Tennessee (10 deaths)
- April 3 – Georgia, North Carolina (4 deaths)
- April 3 – Tennessee, Kentucky (5 deaths)
- April 3 – Alabama (28 deaths)
- April 3 – Kentucky (2 deaths)
- April 3 – Tennessee (7 deaths)
- April 3 – Tennessee (1 death)
- April 3 – Alabama (2 deaths)
- April 3 – Tennessee (3 deaths)
- April 3 – Tennessee (2 deaths)
- April 4 – West Virginia (1 death)
- April 4 – Virginia (1 death)
- April 8 – Georgia (1 death)
- April 21 – Wisconsin (2 deaths)
- May 11 – Michigan (1 death)
- May 12 – Georgia (2 deaths)
- May 12 – Georgia (1 death)
- May 26 – South Carolina (6 deaths)
- June 6 – Arkansas (4 deaths)
- June 7 – Tennessee (1 death)
- June 8 – Oklahoma (14 deaths)
- June 8 – Oklahoma (2 deaths)
- June 8 – Kansas (6 deaths)
- June 18 – Iowa (2 deaths)
- June 20 – Iowa (1 death)
- June 23 – Arizona (1 death)
- October 10 – New Mexico (1 death)
- October 28 – Texas (1 death)
- October 28 – Texas (1 death)
- October 29 – Louisiana (2 deaths)
Total fatalities: 366

1974 was exceptionally above average with a record number of seven F5 tornadoes in one year. 366 deaths occurred and almost 7,000 injuries occurred. The worst tornado outbreak of the record-breaking year was the Super Outbreak of April 3-4, which spawned all seven F5 tornadoes.

== Events ==
Confirmed tornadoes by Fujita rating
FU	F0	F1	F2	F3	F4	F5	Total
0	222	384	208	95	29	7	945

== January ==
24 tornadoes were reported in the U.S. in the month of January.

== February ==
23 tornadoes were reported in the U.S. in the month of February.

== March ==
36 tornadoes were reported in the U.S. in the month of March.

== April ==
267 tornadoes were reported in the U.S. in the month of April.

=== April 1–2 ===
FU	F0	F1	F2	F3	F4	F5
0	2	8	10	3	0	0

A minor two–day tornado outbreak caused 23 tornadoes to form. One of which struck Lawrenceville, Illinois. Another tornado struck Lafayette, Indiana and was given an F2 rating. An F3 tornado struck Huntsville, Alabama killing 1 person. Several F2 tornadoes touched down across Mississippi and Alabama during the outbreak as well.

=== April 3–4 ===
FU	F0	F1	F2	F3	F4	F5
0	18	32	35	34	23	7

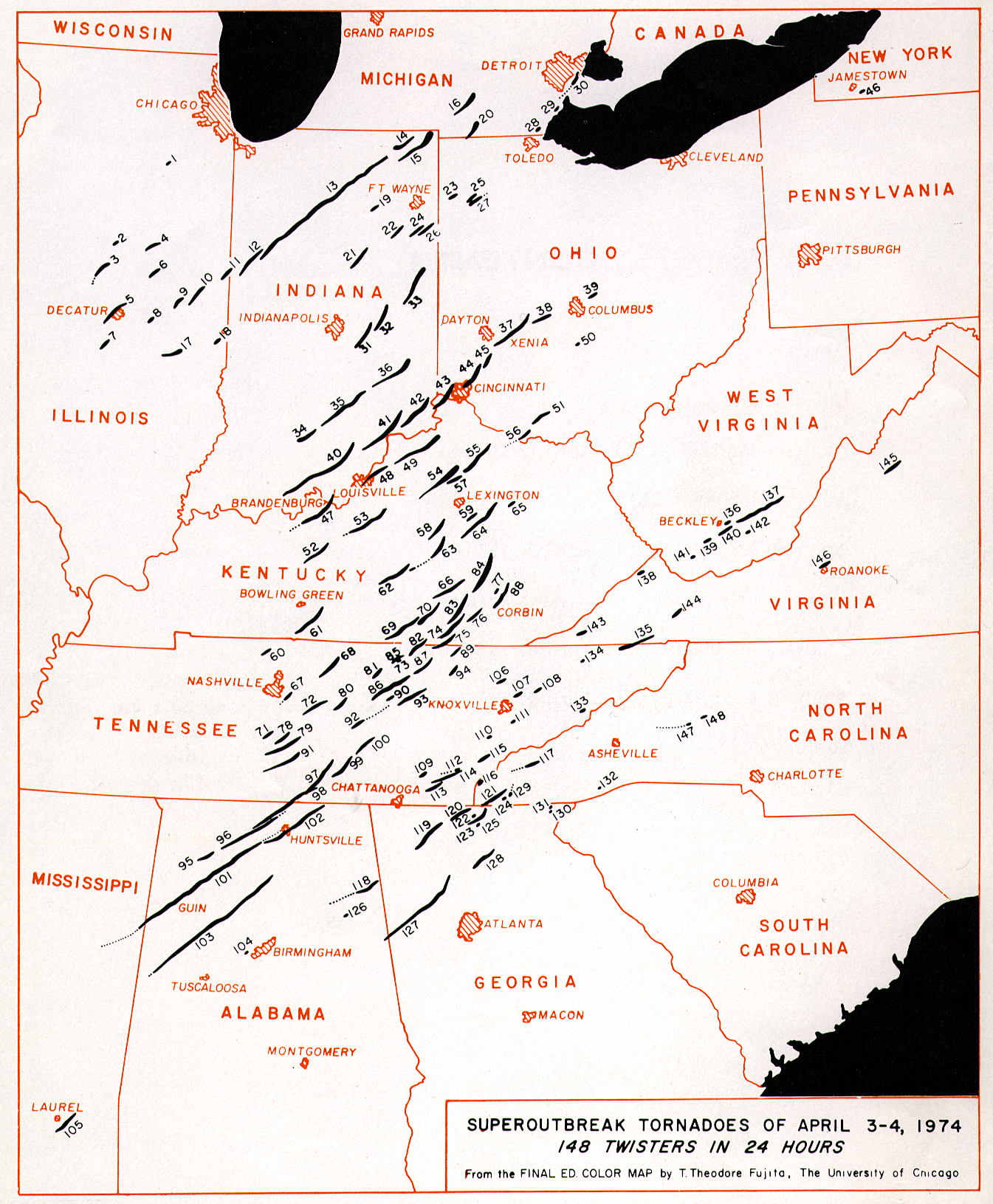
Paths of the 148 tornadoes generated during the 1974 Super Outbreak.

The 1974 Super Outbreak was one of the most destructive tornado outbreaks ever known in United States history. Many notable tornadoes occurred, such as the Xenia, Ohio tornado which was an F5 tornado that killed 34 people and destroyed a large portion of the town. The Xenia tornado was so strong and the damage so severe, that Dr. Fujita considered rating it an F6, although the scale only went to F5. He decided not to since some of the damage that would indicate that it could be the mythical F6, might have been due to the structure not being as strong as it should in the first place. One of the 30 violent tornadoes, an F4 striking Monticello, Indiana, produced the longest damage path recorded during the 1974 Super Outbreak, on a southwest to northeast path that nearly crossed the entire state of Indiana. According to most records, this tornado formed near Otterbein in Benton County in west central Indiana to Noble County just northwest of Fort Wayne - a total distance of about 121 miles (195 km). Much of the town was destroyed including the courthouse, some churches and cemeteries, 40 businesses and numerous homes as well as three schools. It also heavily damaged the Penn Central bridge over the Tippecanoe River. Overall damage according to the NOAA was estimated at US$250 million with US$100 million damage in Monticello alone. The Monticello tornado caused 18 deaths. One of the seven F5 tornadoes, the Huntsville, Alabama tornado, took a similar path of the tornado that struck Huntsville on April 1.

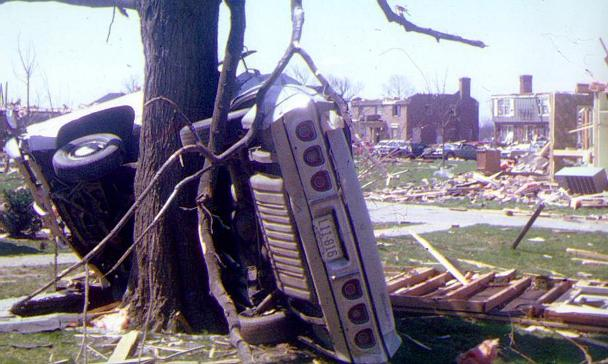
Damage from an F4 tornado in a Louisville neighborhood.

A large, F4 tornado struck Louisville, killing 3 people and demolished most of Audubon Elementary School and affected the neighborhoods of Audubon, Cherokee Triangle, Cherokee-Seneca, Crescent Hill, Indian Hills, Northfield, Rolling Fields, and Tyler Park. The fast-moving nighttime tornado that devastated the town of Guin, was the longest-duration F5 tornado recorded in the outbreak and considered to be one of the most violent ever recorded. The Guin Tornado traveled over 100 miles (160 km) to just west of Huntsville before lifting just after 10:30 pm CDT. It formed at around 8:50 pm CDT near the Mississippi-Alabama border, striking the Monterey Trailer Park, resulting in major damage at that location. The tornado then became extremely violent as it approached and entered Guin, with multiple areas of F5 damage noted in and around town. The tornado first struck the Guin Mobile Home Plant as it entered the town, completely obliterating the structure. Nothing was left of the plant but a pile of mangled steel beams. The town's downtown area was also heavily damaged, with many businesses and two churches completely destroyed. Residential areas in Guin suffered total devastation, with many homes swept completely away and scattered across fields. There were at least 148 tornadoes in the tornado outbreak and 318 fatalities, a record that was beat by the 2011 Super Outbreak.

=== April 8 ===
Three F2 tornadoes struck Tennessee, South Carolina and Georgia. A F2 tornado destroyed small home while damaging 45 others and leaving 1 injury in Athens, Tennessee. A F2 tornado destroyed small home along with other farm buildings near Sadlers Creek State Park, South Carolina with one injury. The only killer tornado on that day was a skipping F2 tornado that struck a mobile home near Lester, Georgia where one person died before destroying a police station in Alapaha, eight were injured by this tornado. In total, there were three tornadoes with one death and ten injuries.

=== April 12–14 ===
A two days outbreak begins with an early morning F2 tornado that struck Alexandria, Louisiana where four barns and eleven mobile homes were destroyed with three injuries. The next day features two F2 in Missouri and one F3 in Illinois. The first of the two F2 tornadoes in Missouri occurred east of Cherry Box where a church was severely damaged and two farms were hit with one farm had the roof and two walls ripped off the house along with a number of outbuildings were destroyed. The strongest tornado of the outbreak was a F3 tornado which damaged or destroyed farm homes, sheds and barns south of Hamilton, Illinois. The tornado may have begun in Missouri. The last tornado of the day was a F2 that tore many homes apart while destroying two garages, five barns and damaging other homes and trailers with two injuries. The last tornadoes of the outbreak were three F2 that occurred in Missouri, New Jersey and Pennsylvania. In total, there were seven significant tornadoes with five injuries and no fatalities

=== April 18–21 ===
FU	F0	F1	F2	F3	F4	F5
0	3	18	8	6	1	0

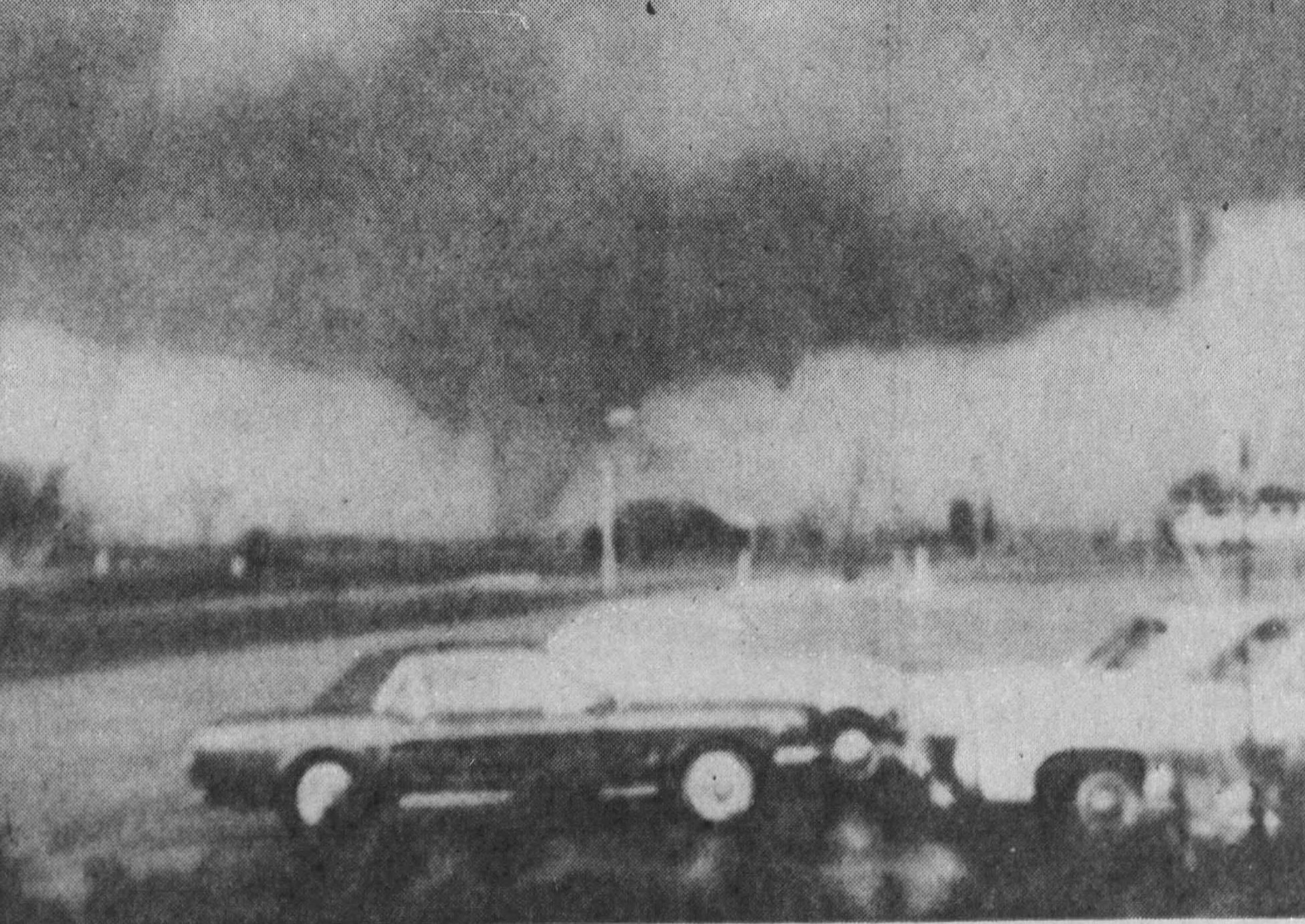
A stovepipe tornado near Howards Grove, Wisconsin on April 21.

A widespread tornado outbreak produced at least 36 tornadoes across the Great Plains and Midwest. A multiple-vortex F3 tornado touched down in Wisconsin, striking Lomira, killing 2 people. 159 miles per hour was calculated as a tornado destroyed 30 farms and then went on to rip apart 300 homes in Oshkosh, Wisconsin.

== May ==
144 tornadoes were reported in the U.S. in the month of May.

== June ==
194 tornadoes were reported in the U.S. in June.

=== June 8 ===
FU	F0	F1	F2	F3	F4	F5
0	10	7	8	9	2	0

A tornado outbreak produced 36 tornadoes, at least 19 of them significant or intense, and is the second-deadliest June tornado event in Oklahoma history, with 16 deaths reported in the state, second only to the 35 people killed by an F4 tornado on June 12, 1942, in Oklahoma City. The deadliest tornado of the outbreak was a powerful F4 that struck the town of Drumright in Oklahoma, killing 14 people, 12 of whom were killed at Drumright. Another deadly and destructive F4 tornado struck the town of Emporia in Kansas, killing six more people. The outbreak also produced two F3 tornadoes in the Tulsa metropolitan area that killed two people and, combined with flooding, produced the costliest natural disaster in that city's history up to that time—a disaster worth $30,000,000 (1974 USD). Additionally, the outbreak produced non-tornadic winds in the city which reached 100 knots (51 m/s) (115 miles per hour (185 km/h)) for several minutes. In addition to confirmed tornadoes, a possible tornado occurred at 8:15 p.m. CST 5 mi (8.0 km) south of Cullison in Kansas, producing intermittent damage, but is not officially listed as a tornado.

=== June 18–20 ===
FU	F0	F1	F2	F3	F4	F5
0	26	12	4	2	1	0

43 tornadoes touched down in the Great Plains and Great Lakes regions, killing 3 people and injuring 78. The strongest tornado of the outbreak was an F4 tornado that struck Des Moines, killing 2 people and injuring 50. June 20 featured 22 tornadoes in Illinois, being one of the highest numbers for Illinois in a single day.

== July ==
59 tornadoes were reported in the U.S. in July.

== August ==
107 tornadoes were reported in the U.S. in August.

== September ==
25 tornadoes were reported in the U.S. in September.

== October ==
45 tornadoes were reported in the U.S. in October.

=== October 10 ===
An F2 tornado hit the Tohajiilee Indian Reservation in New Mexico. The National Oceanic and Atmospheric Administration's record of the tornado states: "Preceded by golf ball size hail, this tornado ripped through the village of Canoncito (now Tohajiilee) killing a 2 week old baby girl and injuring 8 others. Three trailer homes were destroyed and up to 10 other houses damaged." It was the first tornado to cause fatalities in New Mexico since 1964.

=== October 28 ===
An F3 tornado touched down in Baytown, Texas and hit the Baytown Tunnel at rush hour. A dozen cars were picked up and thrown against each other and against the walls of the tunnel entrance. A tunnel guard described the event as "like a big vacuum cleaner". One man died when his car was picked up and thrown over a 20-foot wall. Seven homes were damaged, a maintenance was destroyed and a gas station canopy was blown off. Officially rated F3, Grazulis rated the tornado F2.

== November ==
13 tornadoes were reported in the U.S. in November.

== December ==
8 tornadoes were reported in the U.S. in December.

== See also ==
- Tornado
  - Tornadoes by year
  - Tornado records
  - Tornado climatology
  - Tornado myths
- List of tornado outbreaks
  - List of F5 and EF5 tornadoes
  - List of North American tornadoes and tornado outbreaks
  - List of 21st-century Canadian tornadoes and tornado outbreaks
  - List of European tornadoes and tornado outbreaks
  - List of tornadoes and tornado outbreaks in Asia
  - List of Southern Hemisphere tornadoes and tornado outbreaks
  - List of tornadoes striking downtown areas
- Tornado intensity
  - Fujita scale
  - Enhanced Fujita scale
