= Tornado outbreak of June 8–10, 1974 =

Weather event in the United States

- The only known view of the Emporia F4

Tornado outbreak
- Tornadoes: 42
- Max. rating: F4 tornado
- Duration: June 8–10, 1974

Overall effects
- Fatalities: 21
- Injuries: 479
- Damage: $66,067,780 ($431,310,000 in 2025 USD) (Note: All losses are in 1974 USD unless otherwise noted.)
- Areas affected: Midwestern and Southern United States
- Part of the tornado outbreaks of 1974

From June 8–10, 1974, a significant tornado outbreak affected portions of the southern Great Plains and the Upper Midwest. (Note: An outbreak is generally defined as a group of at least six tornadoes (the number sometimes varies slightly according to local climatology) with no more than a six-hour gap between individual tornadoes. An outbreak sequence, prior to (after) the start of modern records in 1950, is defined as a period of no more than two (one) consecutive days without at least one significant (F2 or stronger) tornado.) The outbreak produced 42 tornadoes, at least 24 of them significant or intense, and is the second-deadliest June tornado event in Oklahoma history, with 16 deaths reported in the state, second only to the 35 people killed by an F4 tornado on June 12, 1942, in Oklahoma City. The deadliest tornado of the outbreak was a powerful F4 that struck the town of Drumright in Oklahoma, killing 14 people, 12 of whom were killed at Drumright. Another deadly and destructive F4 tornado struck the town of Emporia in Kansas, killing six more people. The outbreak also produced two F3 tornadoes in the Tulsa metropolitan area that, combined with flooding, produced the costliest natural disaster in that city's history up to that time—a disaster worth $30,000,000 (1974 USD). Tornadoes hit Oklahoma City five times, a single-day record for the city as of 2010.

== Confirmed tornadoes ==
Confirmed tornadoes by Fujita rating
| FU | F0 | F1 | F2 | F3 | F4 | F5 | Total |
|---|---|---|---|---|---|---|---|
| 2 | 13 | 16 | 13 | 9 | 2 | 0 | 42 |

- In addition to confirmed tornadoes, a possible tornado occurred at 8:15 p.m. CST (02:15 UTC) approximately 5 mi (8.0 km) south of Cullison in Kansas, producing intermittent damage, but is not officially listed as a tornado.

Prior to 1990, there is a likely undercount of tornadoes, particularly E/F0–1, with reports of weaker tornadoes becoming more common as population increased. A sharp increase in the annual average E/F0–1 count by approximately 200 tornadoes was noted upon the implementation of NEXRAD Doppler weather radar in 1990–1991. (Note: Historically, the number of tornadoes globally and in the United States was and is likely underrepresented: research by Grazulis on annual tornado activity suggests that, as of 2001, only 53% of yearly U.S. tornadoes were officially recorded. Documentation of tornadoes outside the United States was historically less exhaustive, owing to the lack of monitors in many nations and, in some cases, to internal political controls on public information. Most countries only recorded tornadoes that produced severe damage or loss of life. Significant low biases in U.S. tornado counts likely occurred through the early 1990s, when advanced NEXRAD was first installed and the National Weather Service began comprehensively verifying tornado occurrences.) 1974 marked the first year where significant tornado (E/F2+) counts became homogenous with contemporary values, attributed to the consistent implementation of Fujita scale assessments. (Note: The Fujita scale was devised under the aegis of scientist T. Theodore Fujita in the early 1970s. Prior to the advent of the scale in 1971, tornadoes in the United States were officially unrated. Tornado ratings were retroactively applied to events prior to the formal adoption of the F-scale by the National Weather Service. While the Fujita scale has been superseded by the Enhanced Fujita scale in the U.S. since February 1, 2007, Canada used the old scale until April 1, 2013; nations elsewhere, like the United Kingdom, apply other classifications such as the TORRO scale.) Numerous discrepancies on the details of tornadoes in this outbreak exist between sources. The total count of tornadoes and ratings differs from various agencies accordingly. The list below documents information from the most contemporary official sources alongside assessments from tornado historian Thomas P. Grazulis.

=== June 8 event ===
List of confirmed tornadoes – Saturday, June 8, 1974
| F# | Location | County / Parish | State | Start Coord. (Note: All starting coordinates are based on the NCEI database and may not reflect contemporary analyses) | Time (UTC) (Note: All dates are based on the local time zone where the tornado touched down; however, all times are in Coordinated Universal Time and dates are split at midnight CST/CDT for consistency.) | Path length | Width (Note: The listed width values are primarily the average/mean width of the tornadoes, with those having known maximum widths denoted by ♯. From 1952 to 1994, reports largely list mean width whereas contemporary years list maximum width. Values provided by Grazulis are the average width, with estimates being rounded down (i.e. 0.5 mi (0.80 km) is rounded down from 880 yards to 800 yards.) | Damage (Note: The National Oceanic and Atmospheric Administration's Storm Data publication does not list exact damage totals for every event, instead giving damage categories. As such, damage for individual tornadoes is not comprehensive.) |
|---|---|---|---|---|---|---|---|---|
| F3 | Southwestern Oklahoma City (1st tornado) to W of Forest Park | Oklahoma | OK | 35.4°N 97.6°W | 19:42–? | 8.9 mi (14.3 km) | 250 yd (230 m) | $2,500,000 |
| F3 | This tornado formed over Will Rogers World Airport, just feet from a National Weather Service (NWS) office. As it did so, a gas leak forced NWS officials to vacate the office and transfer duties to the NWS in Tulsa. The tornado then unroofed a hangar before hitting the NWS office and damaging 672 homes, 42 of them severely. It also destroyed a few trailers, five small businesses, and 11 homes. 14 minor injuries were reported. | | | | | | | |
| F2 | Northern Spencer to western Jones | Oklahoma | OK | 35.52°N 97.37°W | 20:11–? | 4.5 mi (7.2 km) | 50 yd (46 m) | $25,000 |
| F2 | This tornado damaged several small businesses, farms, and power lines. According to Grazulis, an unoccupied two-story home was "leveled", suggesting F4 intensity, but may have been poorly built. | | | | | | | |
| F3 | NNE of Spencer to S of Luther | Oklahoma | OK | 35.55°N 97.35°W | 20:18–? | 10.2 mi (16.4 km) | 600 yd (550 m) | $2,500 |
| F3 | This tornado downed a quartet of steel transmission towers, all able to survive 150-mile-per-hour (240 km/h) winds. | | | | | | | |
| F1 | NNE of Breckinridge | Garfield | OK | 36.47°N 97.7°W | 20:30–? | 0.2 mi (0.32 km) | 23 yd (21 m) | $25,000 |
| F1 | A tornado hit a small farm, felling trees and damaging sheds. | | | | | | | |
| F0 | SW of Leon to NNW of Latham | Butler | KS | 37.67°N 96.8°W | 21:15–? | 11.4 mi (18.3 km) | 200 yd (180 m) | Unknown |
| F0 | A tornado damaged wheat fields. | | | | | | | |
| F0 | S of Lyons to WNW of Mitchell | Rice | KS | 38.33°N 98.2°W | 21:30–? | 5.2 mi (8.4 km) | 100 yd (91 m) | $2,500 |
| F0 | Only fences and trees were damaged. | | | | | | | |
| F1 | Southwestern Oklahoma City (2nd tornado) | Oklahoma | OK | 35.4°N 97.57°W | 21:35–? | 2.5 mi (4.0 km) | 100 yd (91 m) | $25,000 |
| F1 | A tornado did mostly modest damage to trees and roofs. | | | | | | | |
| F3 | ESE of Nicoma Park to N of Harrah | Oklahoma | OK | 35.48°N 97.3°W | 21:48–? | 9 mi (14 km) | 127 yd (116 m) | $25,000 |
| F3 | This tornado destroyed or damaged utilities and farms. Power poles, outbuildings, and an Oklahoma Gas & Electric plant were impacted. | | | | | | | |
| F0 | Flora | Clay | IL | 38.67°N 88.48°W | 21:50–? | 0.1 mi (0.16 km) | 33 yd (30 m) | Unknown |
| F0 | Observers spotted a brief tornado, but did not report any damage. | | | | | | | |
| F4 | SW of Drumright to Olive to NW of Skiatook | Payne, Creek, Pawnee, Osage | OK | 35.95°N 96.65°W | 21:55–? | 55 mi (89 km) | 400 yd (370 m) | $3,500,000 |
| F4 | 14 deaths – This violent tornado first hit a school in the Oak Grove community, then impacted northwestern Drumright, claiming half a dozen lives in a nursing home. Sirens sounded in time, but barely, though more deaths might have occurred had the tornado hit minutes later, when the dining hall was crowded. Across Drumright the tornado badly damaged or destroyed 100 homes—many of them costly and sturdy—killing six more people and leaving about 1,000 homeless. At Olive it caused another death, partly destroying a school and wrecking a pair of trailers; it leveled many frame homes there as well. On Lake Keystone it damaged a pier, and destroyed more trailers nearby, mortally injuring a woman. The tornado then damaged some brick homes before dissipating. 150 people were injured. | | | | | | | |
| F0 | SW of Carmi | White | IL | 38.05°N 88.20°W | 21:55–? | 0.1 mi (0.16 km) | 33 yd (30 m) | Unknown |
| F0 | No damage occurred. | | | | | | | |
| F3 | SW of Davenport to Stroud | Lincoln | OK | 35.68°N 96.8°W | 22:46–? | 6.8 mi (10.9 km) | 1,300 yd (1,200 m) | $2,500,000 |
| F3 | A tornado struck Davenport and Stroud, causing severe damage. In Davenport it badly damaged or destroyed 27 homes and slightly damaged 233 others. In Stroud it damaged a couple of businesses and 100 homes, while destroying a service station. Eight people were injured, half of them by airborne glass. | | | | | | | |
| F1 | N of Davenport | Lincoln | OK | 35.67°N 96.77°W | 22:55–? | 1.5 mi (2.4 km) | 50 yd (46 m) | $250 |
| F1 | This tornado slightly damaged a pair of outbuildings. | | | | | | | |
| F4 | Northwestern Emporia to SW of Auburn | Lyon, Osage, Shawnee | KS | 38.42°N 96.22°W | 23:00–00:04 | 37.5 mi (60.4 km) | 880 yd (800 m) | $50,000,000 |
| F4 | 6 deaths – A large, violent tornado—occasionally up to 1/2 mi (0.80 km) wide—hit Emporia, where it badly damaged or destroyed the Flint Hills Shopping Center, homes, apartments, trailers, and a nursing home. The tornado wrecked all 20 shops in the center, where 75 or more cars were thrown and mangled. Five of the six deaths, along with most of the injuries, occurred in a sprawling trailer park, while the sixth took place in an apartment complex. F4 damage affected portions of Emporia, and 80 hospitalizations were reported. Beyond Emporia, the tornado continued intermittently, destroying 10 or more farms. Estimates of the injured ranged from 177 to 220, with Storm Data listing 200. | | | | | | | |
| F2 | NNW of Stroud | Lincoln | OK | 35.77°N 96.68°W | 23:03–? | 4.5 mi (7.2 km) | 1,000 yd (910 m) | $25,000 |
| F2 | This tornado destroyed some barns, while damaging outbuildings and farmhouses. | | | | | | | |
| F0 | N of Grenola | Elk | KS | 37.47°N 96.45°W | 23:10–? | 0.1 mi (0.16 km) | 100 yd (91 m) | Unknown |
| F0 | No damage was observed. | | | | | | | |
| F3 | ENE of Sparks | Lincoln | OK | 35.62°N 96.73°W | 23:20–? | 2.5 mi (4.0 km) | 350 yd (320 m) | $25,000 |
| F3 | A short-lived tornado wrecked trailers and barns, while damaging trees and outbuildings. | | | | | | | |
| F2 | SSW of Bellvue to WSW of Heyburn | Creek | OK | 35.87°N 96.4°W | 23:35–? | 4.3 mi (6.9 km) | 100 yd (91 m) | $25,000 |
| F2 | According to Storm Data, a narrow tornado damaged outbuildings and "two or three" barns. Grazulis did not rate it F2 or stronger. | | | | | | | |
| F2 | NNW of Owasso to N of Collinsville | Tulsa | OK | 36.33°N 95.88°W | 23:40–? | 5.4 mi (8.7 km) | 60 yd (55 m) | $25,000 |
| F2 | This tornado damaged a pair of farms. Grazulis did not rate it F2 or stronger. | | | | | | | |
| F2 | NNE of Earlsboro to Little to NW of Sylvian | Seminole | OK | 35.3°N 96.78°W | 23:45–? | 11.8 mi (19.0 km) | 450 yd (410 m) | $2,500,000 |
| F2 | This tornado extensively damaged several homes and a school. It destroyed half a dozen other homes as well, while killing a cow and four horses. Grazulis rated it F3. | | | | | | | |
| F3 | W of Tulsa to W of Vinita | Tulsa, Rogers, Mayes, Craig | OK | 36°N 96.1°W | 23:50–? | 45 mi (72 km) | 100 yd (91 m) | Unknown |
| F3 | 1 death – One of two major tornadoes to hit metropolitan Tulsa, this tornado tracked east-northeast through town, hitting the Brookside and other neighborhoods. As it did so, it fatally injured a girl and caused "considerable damage", according to NWS Tulsa. Leaving Tulsa, it damaged areas in or near Catoosa, Claremore, and Big Cabin before dissipating. 80 people were injured. Some sources list path lengths of 50 to 64 mi (80 to 103 km) and a second death, but the latter was flood-related. Prolific rainfall, along with flash floods, attended this and the next tornado, causing one of Tulsa's "worst natural disasters" to date, Grazulis noted. | | | | | | | |
| F3 | W of Sapulpa to S of Sportsman Acres | Creek, Tulsa, Wagoner, Rogers, Mayes | OK | 35.98°N 96°W | 23:50–? | 49 mi (79 km) | 100 yd (91 m) | Unknown |
| F3 | The second F3 Tulsa twister extensively damaged Oral Roberts University (ORU) as it tracked northeast, generating winds of 100 kn (120 mph; 190 km/h) "for several minutes" at Tulsa Riverside Airport, Storm Data reported. At ORU the tornado destroyed a pair of unfinished buildings and damaged a few dormitory roofs. It also unroofed homes in the Park Player, Southridge Estates, and Walnut Creek subdivisions. Beyond Tulsa, it damaged the towns of Broken Arrow, Inola, and Chouteau before dissipating. 42 people were injured. This and the previous event combined with flooding to produce $30 million in losses. Both Tulsa F3s damaged about 300 homes and numerous businesses, leaving more than 1,500 Tulsa residents homeless. | | | | | | | |
| F3 | WSW of Keokuk Falls to NNW of Tuskegee | Seminole, Okfuskee | OK | 35.4°N 96.68°W | 00:05–? | 29.9 mi (48.1 km) | 1,300 yd (1,200 m) | $250,000 |
| F3 | An intense tornado destroyed many farmhouses, ending south-southwest of Slick. | | | | | | | |
| F2 | S of Newalla | Pottawatomie | OK | 35.33°N 97.15°W | 00:50–? | 2 mi (3.2 km) | 800 yd (730 m) | $25,000 |
| F2 | This tornado damaged outbuildings and destroyed a trailer. | | | | | | | |
| F0 | NNW of Oreana | Macon | IL | 39.98°N 88.88°W | 00:55–? | 0.1 mi (0.16 km) | 33 yd (30 m) | Unknown |
| F0 | Forming near Argenta, this brief tornado did no damage. | | | | | | | |
| F0 | WNW of Stanberry | Gentry | MO | 40.22°N 94.55°W | 01:00–? | 0.1 mi (0.16 km) | 33 yd (30 m) | $25,000 |
| F0 | A short-lived tornado pulled up roof shingles. | | | | | | | |
| F2 | WSW of Kiefer to NNE of Bixby | Creek, Tulsa | OK | 35.92°N 96.12°W | 01:30–? | 14.4 mi (23.2 km) | 100 yd (91 m) | $250,000 |
| F2 | This tornado extensively damaged farms, destroying buildings. | | | | | | | |
| F0 | S of Beulah to SW of Radley | Crawford | KS | 37.42°N 94.83°W | 02:00–? | 4.3 mi (6.9 km) | 200 yd (180 m) | Unknown |
| F0 | Power lines and trees were damaged. | | | | | | | |
| F3 | SSE of Eucha | Delaware | OK | 36.37°N 94.9°W | 03:14–? | 2.7 mi (4.3 km) | 150 yd (140 m) | $250,000 |
| F3 | According to Storm Data, this tornado extensively damaged bridges and roads. It also hurled a pair of houseboats, while unroofing and destroying many homes. Grazulis rated it F2, but noted "near-F3" damage to a brick home. | | | | | | | |
| F1 | Neosho | Newton | MO | 36.85°N 94.4°W | 03:30–? | 1 mi (1.6 km) | 150 yd (140 m) | $150,000 |
| F1 | Half the city was left powerless. | | | | | | | |
| F2 | W of Bernice | Craig | OK | 36.6°N 95°W | 03:30–? | 3.8 mi (6.1 km) | 100 yd (91 m) | $2,500,000 |
| F2 | This tornado hit trees, roofs, and utility poles, doing significant damage. A rural electric association plant incurred a loss of $100,000. Grauzlis listed a path length of 10 mi (16 km), starting near Ketchum and ending near Grove. | | | | | | | |
| F0 | Sarcoxie | Jasper | MO | 37.07°N 94.12°W | 03:40–? | 0.1 mi (0.16 km) | 33 yd (30 m) | $25,000 |
| F0 | Only a brief touchdown occurred. | | | | | | | |
| F1 | WSW of Diamond | Newton | MO | 36.9°N 94.33°W | 03:40–? | 2 mi (3.2 km) | 50 yd (46 m) | Unknown |
| F1 | This tornado hit the George Washington Carver National Monument, felling 200 trees. | | | | | | | |
| F1 | W of Graham to WNW of Arkoe | Nodaway | MO | 40.2°N 95.05°W | 04:00–? | 10.1 mi (16.3 km) | 400 yd (370 m) | $25,000 |
| F1 | This tornado uprooted trees and badly damaged a farm, dissipating south of Maryville. | | | | | | | |
| F1 | SSE of Indianola | Pittsburg | OK | 35.12°N 95.75°W | 04:24–? | 1 mi (1.6 km) | 67 mi (108 km) | Unknown |
| F1 | No damage occurred. The tornado may have hit north of Bugtussle. | | | | | | | |

=== June 9 event ===
List of confirmed tornadoes – Sunday, June 9, 1974
| F# | Location | County / Parish | State | Start Coord. | Time (UTC) | Path length | Width | Damage |
|---|---|---|---|---|---|---|---|---|
| F2 | Sarepta to Porterville | Webster | LA | 32.9°N 93.45°W | 16:05–? | 4.5 mi (7.2 km) | 100 yd (91 m) | $250,000 |
| F2 | This tornado unroofed a lumber company and damaged over 12 homes. Grauzlis did not rate it F2 or stronger. | | | | | | | |
| F1 | E of Dakota City | Humboldt | IA | 42.72°N 94.13°W | 17:30–? | 2 mi (3.2 km) | 100 yd (91 m) | $250,000 |
| F1 | This tornado damaged a few farms. | | | | | | | |
| F2 | W of Wesley | Kossuth | IA | 43.08°N 94.02°W | 19:30–? | 0.1 mi (0.16 km) | 33 yd (30 m) | $250,000 |
| F2 | A low-end F2 tornado destroyed garages and a barn. It also damaged four farms and almost unroofed three homes. Grauzlis listed a 5-mile (8.0 km) path length. | | | | | | | |
| F1 | Southeastern Leola | Adams | WI | 44.17°N 89.6°W | 20:30–? | 1 mi (1.6 km) | 50 yd (46 m) | $25,000 |
| F1 | This tornado damaged three homes, while destroying outbuildings and a barn. | | | | | | | |
| F1 | NNW of Bancroft | Portage | WI | 44.32°N 89.52°W | 20:45–? | 2.5 mi (4.0 km) | 30 yd (27 m) | $2,500 |
| F1 | This tornado slightly damaged trees. It also damaged a porch, barn, and chicken coop. | | | | | | | |
| F1 | Northwestern Rochester | Olmsted | MN | 44.08°N 92.53°W | 20:57–? | 0.1 mi (0.16 km) | 10 yd (9.1 m) | $2,500 |
| F1 | This tornado unroofed 2,500 ft^{2} (230 m^{2}) of an IBM plant. It also tipped a trailer onto its side and bent a large sign. | | | | | | | |
| F1 | Eastern Seymour to SSW of Cadott | Eau Claire, Chippewa | WI | 44.85°N 91.23°W | 22:45–? | 3.3 mi (5.3 km) | 50 yd (46 m) | $2,500 |
| F1 | This tornado felled trees, while slightly damaging a shed, corncrib, and garage. | | | | | | | |
| FU | Oak Forest | Cook | IL | Unknown | 22:55–? | Unknown | Unknown | Unknown |
| FU | Minor damage occurred. | | | | | | | |
| F0 | Northeastern Peoria | Peoria | IL | 40.72°N 89.58°W | 23:15–? | 0.1 mi (0.16 km) | 33 yd (30 m) | Unknown |
| F0 | Minor damage occurred. The NCEI incorrectly list the date as June 8, but Storm Data indicates June 9. | | | | | | | |
| F1 | S of Sleepy Hollow | Kane | IL | 42.08°N 88.3°W | 00:40–? | 0.1 mi (0.16 km) | 33 yd (30 m) | Unknown |
| F1 | Little or no damage occurred, other than to power lines and trees. | | | | | | | |
| F0 | NE of Somers | Kenosha | WI | 42.65°N 87.9°W | 00:55–? | 2 mi (3.2 km) | 50 yd (46 m) | $250,000 |
| F0 | A brief tornado caused much tree damage and tore the roof off a barn, hurling it into a steel shed; both structures incurred severe damage, along with machinery. The tornado injured livestock as well. | | | | | | | |
| F2 | Big Rapids | Mecosta | MI | 43.7°N 85.48°W | 01:10–? | 1.5 mi (2.4 km) | 100 yd (91 m) | $250,000 |
| F2 | A strong tornado hit Ferris State University (then College), tearing loose a wall and smashing windows. It then shifted a nearby home off its foundation, while damaging the windows and roof of a gym at Riverview Elementary School. Several other homes received similar wall and roof damage, while a trailer was wrecked. Two injuries occurred. | | | | | | | |
| F1 | Bradley | Kankakee | IL | 41.13°N 87.87°W | 01:44–? | 0.1 mi (0.16 km) | 10 yd (9.1 m) | Unknown |
| F1 | A brief tornado damaged power lines. | | | | | | | |
| FU | Markham | Cook | IL | Unknown | 02:17–? | Unknown | Unknown | Unknown |
| FU | Minor damage occurred. | | | | | | | |

=== June 10 event ===
List of confirmed tornadoes – Monday, June 10, 1974
| F# | Location | County / Parish | State | Start Coord. | Time (UTC) | Path length | Width | Damage |
|---|---|---|---|---|---|---|---|---|
| F2 | Higgins Lake | Roscommon | MI | 44.47°N 84.73°W | 06:01–? | 0.3 mi (0.48 km) | 50 yd (46 m) | $2,500 |
| F2 | A strong tornado ripped apart 2-to-3-foot-diameter (0.61 to 0.91 m) trees, but only slightly damaged buildings. Grazulis did not rate it F2 or stronger. | | | | | | | |
| F1 | Harrison City | Westmoreland | PA | 40.4°N 79.58°W | 20:45–? | 0.4 mi (0.64 km) | 133 yd (122 m) | $30 |
| F1 | This tornado felled utility poles and trees, while blowing off roof shingles. It also damaged trailers and other homes. | | | | | | | |
| F0 | Dover | Hillsborough | FL | 27.83°N 82.22°W | 20:45–? | 0.1 mi (0.16 km) | 10 yd (9.1 m) | $2,500 |
| F0 | This tornado mostly caused minor roof and other damage, but destroyed some utility sheds. | | | | | | | |
| F0 | SSE of Barnard to W of Huffton | Brown | SD | 45.72°N 98.48°W | 22:30–? | 15 mi (24 km) | 100 yd (91 m) | Unknown |
| F0 | This tornado only hit open country. | | | | | | | |
| F2 | W of Coats | Pratt | KS | 37.52°N 98.9°W | 02:15–? | 1 mi (1.6 km) | 50 yd (46 m) | $25,000 |
| F2 | This tornado wrecked three grain bins and damaged several buildings. Grazulis did not rate it F2 or stronger. | | | | | | | |
| F1 | Southeastern Carmel | Hamilton | IN | 39.97°N 86.1°W | 02:55–? | 1.5 mi (2.4 km) | 150 yd (140 m) | $25,000 |
| F1 | This tornado formed in a cold airmass. Other information is unavailable. | | | | | | | |

== See also ==
- 1999 Oklahoma tornado outbreak – Produced a devastating F5 tornado in metropolitan Oklahoma City

== Sources ==
- Agee, Ernest M.; Childs, Samuel (June 1, 2014). "Adjustments in Tornado Counts, F-Scale Intensity, and Path Width for Assessing Significant Tornado Destruction". Journal of Applied Meteorology and Climatology. 53 (6). American Meteorological Society: 1494–1505. doi:10.1175/JAMC-D-13-0235.1.
- Brooks, Harold E. (April 2004). "On the Relationship of Tornado Path Length and Width to Intensity". Weather and Forecasting. 19 (2): 310–19. Bibcode:2004WtFor..19..310B. doi:10.1175/1520-0434(2004)019<0310:OTROTP>2.0.CO;2.
- Cook, A. R.; Schaefer, J. T. (August 2008). "The Relation of El Niño–Southern Oscillation (ENSO) to Winter Tornado Outbreaks". Monthly Weather Review. 136 (8): 3121–3137. Bibcode:2008MWRv..136.3121C. doi:10.1175/2007MWR2171.1.
- Edwards, Roger; LaDue, James G.; Ferree, John T.; Scharfenberg, Kevin; Maier, Chris; Coulbourne, William L. (May 1, 2013). "Tornado Intensity Estimation: Past, Present, and Future". Bulletin of the American Meteorological Society. 94 (5). American Meteorological Society: 641–653. doi:10.1175/BAMS-D-11-00006.1.
- Grazulis, Thomas P. (May 1984). Violent Tornado Climatography, 1880–1982. OSTI (Technical report). NUREG. Washington, D.C.: Nuclear Regulatory Commission. OSTI 7099491. CR-3670.
  - — (November 1990). Significant Tornadoes 1880–1989. Vol. 2. St. Johnsbury, Vermont: The Tornado Project of Environmental Films. ISBN 1-879362-02-3.
  - — (July 1993). Significant Tornadoes 1680–1991: A Chronology and Analysis of Events. St. Johnsbury, Vermont: The Tornado Project of Environmental Films. ISBN 1-879362-03-1.
  - — (2001a). The Tornado: Nature's Ultimate Windstorm. Norman: University of Oklahoma Press. ISBN 978-0-8061-3538-0 – via Internet Archive.
  - — (2001b). F5-F6 Tornadoes. St. Johnsbury, Vermont: The Tornado Project of Environmental Films.
- Smith, Mike (2010). Warnings: the True Story of How Science Tamed the Weather. Austin, Texas: Greenleaf Book Group. ISBN 978-1-60832-034-9 – via Internet Archive.
- National Weather Service (June 1974). Storm Data Publication (Report). National Centers for Environmental Information – via Storm Events Database.
- U.S. Weather Bureau (June 1974). "Storm Data and Unusual Weather Phenomena". Storm Data. 16 (6). Asheville, North Carolina: National Climatic Data Center.
