= 1974 Cincinnati tornado =

F5 tornado in 1974

- A photograph of the tornado, as it was moving through the Bridgetown area in western Hamilton County, Ohio

Meteorological history
- Formed: April 3, 1974; 4:30 p.m. CDT (UTC–05:00)
- Dissipated: April 3, 1974; 4:53 p.m. CDT (UTC–05:00)
- Duration: 23 minutes

F5 tornado
- on the Fujita scale
- Highest winds: >261 mph (420 km/h)

Overall effects
- Fatalities: 5 (+1 indirect)
- Injuries: 219
- Areas affected: Ohio County, Indiana, Boone County, Kentucky, and Hamilton County, Ohio; particularly the Sayler Park neighborhood of Cincinnati
- Part of the 1974 Super Outbreak and Tornadoes of 1974

The 1974 Cincinnati tornado (also known as the 1974 Sayler Park tornado) was a small but powerful tornado that moved through three states, including Kentucky, Ohio and Indiana during the afternoon hours of April 3, 1974. The tornado hit the Cincinnati metropolitan area and areas to the northeast of the metroplex, killing five people and injuring over two hundred more. The tornado touched down as part of the 1974 Super Outbreak, one of the largest tornado outbreaks in recorded history.

The tornado would first touch down at approximately 4:30 pm CDT, only three minutes before the Xenia, Ohio F5 tornado. The tornado tracked through areas southwest of Cincinnati before crossing the Indiana-Kentucky border, where it would begin to track directly towards Cincinnati. The tornado would end up moving through the southern portions of the city, where it heavily damaged structures and lofted cars in the air before entering the Sayler Park neighborhood at F5 intensity, where concrete structures were destroyed. The tornado would continue to move through the city, injuring several people before lifting near White Oak at 4:53 pm CDT, after being on the ground for twenty-three minutes and tracking 21 mi (34 km).

== Meteorological synopsis ==
By 12:00 UTC on April 3, a large-scale trough extended over most of the contiguous United States, with several modest shortwaves rotating around the broad base of the trough. The mid-latitude low-pressure center over Kansas continued to deepen to 980 mb (28.94 inHg), and wind speeds at the 850-mb level increased to 50 kn (58 mph) (25.7 m/s (93 km/h)) over portions of Louisiana, Mississippi, and Alabama. Due to significant moisture advection, destabilization rapidly proceeded apace; the warm front near the Gulf Coast dissipated and then redeveloped northward over the Ohio River valley. Consequently, CAPE levels in the region rose to 1,000 J/kg. However, a warm temperature plume in the elevated mixed layer kept thunderstorms from initiating at the surface. Meanwhile, a large mesoscale convective system (MCS) that had developed overnight in Arkansas continued to strengthen due to strong environmental lapse rates. Later in the day, strong daytime heating caused instability to further rise. By 18:00 UTC, CAPE values in excess of 2,500 J/kg were present over the lower Ohio and the Mississippi Valley. As wind speeds in the troposphere increased, large-scale lifting overspread the warm sector. At the same time, the forward-propagating MCS spread into the Tennessee and Ohio valleys, where it evolved into the first of three main convection bands that produced tornadoes. This first convective band moved rapidly northeast, at times reaching speeds of about 60 kn (69 mph) (30.9 m/s (111 km/h)). However, thunderstorm activity, for the moment, remained mostly elevated in nature.

By 16:30 UTC, the large MCS began to splinter into two sections: the southern part slowed, lagging into southeast Tennessee, while the northern part accelerated, reaching Pennsylvania by 19:30 UTC. The split was related to several factors, including a band of subsidence over eastern Kentucky and western West Virginia; local downslope winds over the Appalachians; and an inversion over the same area. These factors allowed the northern part of the MCS to accelerate due to efficient ducting, while the southern part slowed as the boundary layer warmed and moistened. Numerous surface-based supercells began to develop in the southern area, beginning with one that produced an F3 tornado at about 16:30 UTC near Cleveland, Tennessee. Meanwhile, a new band of scattered thunderstorms developed at 15:00 UTC over eastern Arkansas and Missouri; over the next four hours, this band became the focus for several intense supercells, starting in eastern Illinois and southern Indiana. In the wake of the MCS, backing low-level winds, rapid diurnal destabilization, and perhaps cool, mid-level advection had occurred over the warm sector, weakening the convective inhibition (CINH) layer, and favorable wind profiles bolstered helicity to over 230 m^{2}/s^{2}—a combination of factors conducive to tornadogenesis. Consequently, the storms increased in intensity and coverage as they moved into Illinois, Indiana, and northern Kentucky, producing several tornadoes, including the first F5 tornado of the day, at 19:20 UTC, near Depauw, Indiana. Several of the storms to form between 19:20 and 20:20 UTC became significant, long-lived supercells, producing many strong or violent tornadoes, including three F5s at Depauw, Xenia, Ohio, and Brandenburg, Kentucky. These storms formed the second of three convective bands to generate tornadoes, including the Sayler Park tornado.

== Tornado summary ==
The Sayler Park tornado was among a series of tornadoes that earlier struck portions of southern Indiana from north of Brandenburg, Kentucky, into southwest Ohio. This tornado was witnessed on television by thousands of people, as WCPO aired the tornado live during special news coverage of the tornadoes. It was also noted for the rarity in that its path was in parts of three states. It began shortly before 4:30 pm CDT or 5:30 pm EDT in southeastern Indiana in Ohio County north of Rising Sun near the Ohio River. It then traveled through Boone County, Kentucky, producing F4 damage in the Taylorsport area before crossing the Ohio River a second time into Ohio. Here, the tornado reached F5 intensity as it slammed into Sayler Park.

The first area of town hit was the Morehead Marina, where numerous boats were thrown and destroyed. A large floating restaurant barge at this location was lifted, ripped from its moorings, and flipped by the tornado. It was later recovered several miles downstream. A nearby house was lifted from its foundation and thrown into the river.

At a further inland area of Sayler Park, the tornado maintained F5 intensity as numerous homes were swept away at a hilly area near a lake, with only bare slabs remaining. NWS surveyors noted that a pickup truck in this area was carried a half block over the roofs of five homes before being smashed to the ground. The tornado weakened somewhat as it continued northeastward, passing through multiple Cincinnati neighborhoods and destroying numerous homes. Some of the worst affected areas were Bridgetown, Mack, Dent and Delhi. Damage in Delhi was rated as high as F4. The tornado took six lives and injured 210, with 190 of the injuries occurring in Hamilton County. It was considered the most-photographed tornado of the outbreak, and tracked a total of 21 mi (34 km) miles.

This tornado dissipated west of White Oak, but the same thunderstorm activity was responsible for two other tornado touchdowns in the Lebanon and Mason areas. The Mason tornado, which started in the northern Cincinnati subdivisions of Arlington Heights and Elmwood Place, was rated F4 and took two lives, while the Warren County tornado was rated an F2 and injured 10.

== Aftermath ==
Much of southern Cincinnati, particularly the West Side and Sayler Park neighborhoods, was devastated by the tornado. Along Holmes City Avenue, trees were felled by the tornado and cars were flipped as the tornado moved by; the West Side would later be declared a disaster area as a result. Despite killing only one person in Sayler Park, the tornado destroyed dozens of houses and several people were injured.

Six people would be killed by the tornado in total; one of these deaths was attributed to a traffic accident and was considered to be indirect. 210 more were injured, the majority of which happened inside of Hamilton County.

List of confirmed direct/indirect fatalities from the tornado
Name	Age	City	State	Cause
Marjorie Sams	17	Eastern Cincinnati	OH	Hit by a falling tree outside of the Withrow High School building.
Jerry Teague	30	Cincinnati	OH	Hit by bricks that were dislodged from the Longview State Hospital.
George Matt	80	Cincinnati	OH	Killed in a traffic accident near the tornado. (Note: Indirect fatality)
James Boyle	39	Cincinnati	OH	Was found dead near to his heavily damaged van near Harrison Avenue.
Albert McMurray	84	Sayler Park, Cincinnati	OH	Killed when his home was swept away along South Road.
Helen Wilson	57	West Union	OH	Found in a pile of debris.

== See also ==
- 1974 Guin tornado, another violent tornado that would touch down on the same day
- 2007 Elie tornado, another tornado that was small but very powerful, occurring in 2007 in Elie, Manitoba, Canada
- 1974 Xenia tornado, another F5 tornado that occurred in Ohio in the same outbreak
