= Capshaw, Alabama =

Unincorporated community in Alabama, United States

- Unincorporated community
- Location within Alabama Location within the United States
- Coordinates: 34°46′23″N 86°47′34″W
- Country: United States
- State: Alabama
- County: Limestone
- Elevation: 676 ft (206 m)
- Time zone: UTC-6 (Central (CST))
  - Summer (DST): UTC-5 (CDT)
- ZIP code: 35742
- Area code: 256
- GNIS feature ID: 115608

Capshaw, formerly known as Lux, is an unincorporated community in eastern Limestone County, Alabama, United States. It is located at the intersection of Capshaw, Sanderson and NW Dupree Worthey Roads. It is now mostly a part of Huntsville

== History ==
The community was named for early settlers David and William Capshaw. David Capshaw (1779–1839) raised a large family in the community. A post office under the name Capshaw was first opened in 1918.
