= 1974 Xenia tornado =

Historic F5 tornado in southwest Ohio

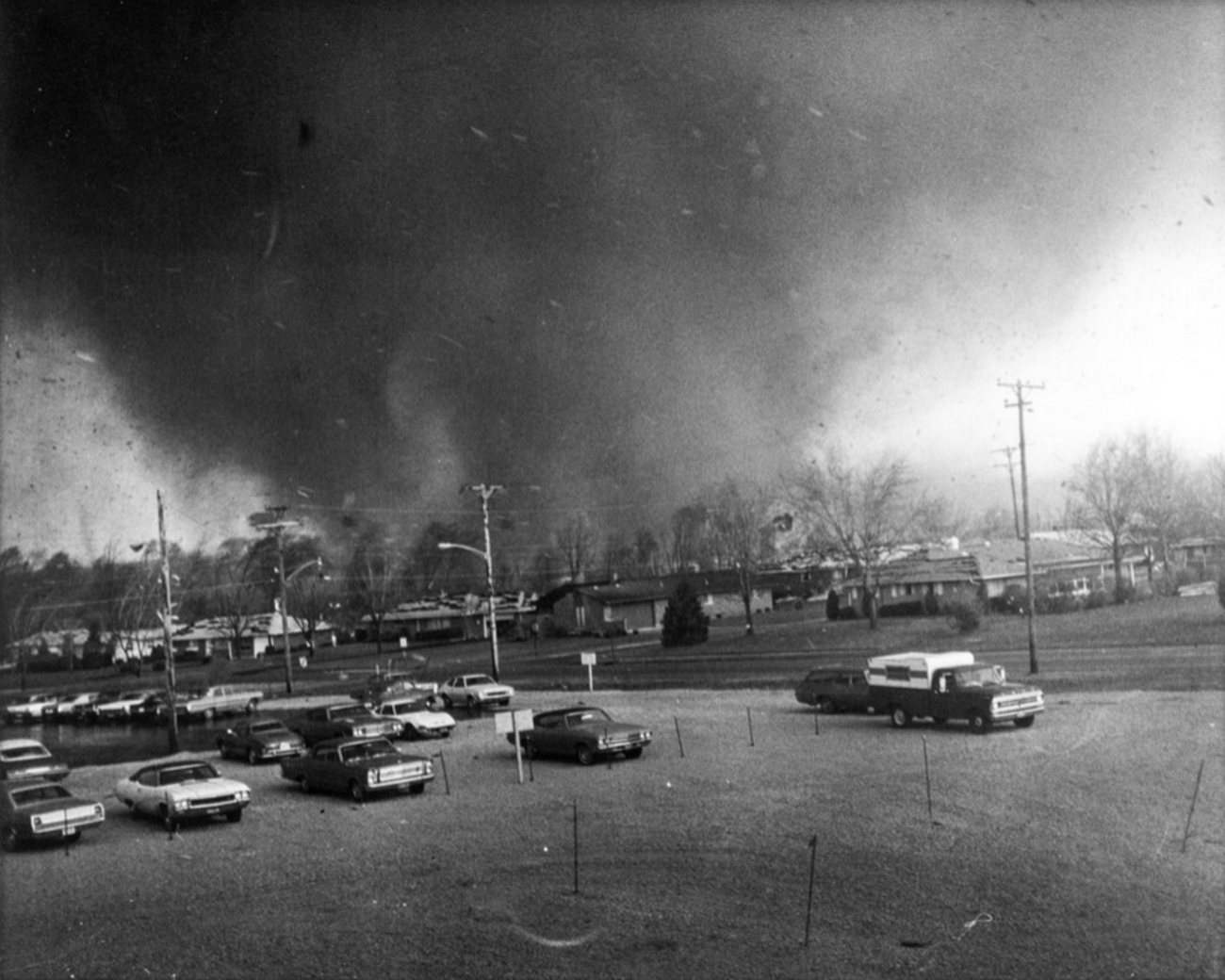
- Clockwise from top: A view of the tornado as it was destroying homes in the southeast Pinecrest Garden district of Xenia; Damage at the Central State University campus in Wilberforce, including defoliated vegetation and damaged buildings; An aerial view of the tornado's track from Xenia to Wilberforce, seen one day after the tornado; Wright Patterson Air Force Base radar imagery of the tornado and associated storm, with a pronounced hook echo seen at bottom-right

Meteorological history
- Formed: April 3, 1974, 4:33 p.m. EDT (UTC–04:00)
- Dissipated: April 3, 1974, 5:12 p.m. EDT (UTC–04:00)
- Duration: 39 minutes

F5 tornado
- on the Fujita scale
- Path length: 31.3 miles (50.4 km)
- Highest winds: 305 mph (491 km/h)

Overall effects
- Fatalities: 32 (+2 indirect)
- Injuries: 1,150
- Damage: $250 million (1974 USD) $1.63 billion (2025 USD)
- Areas affected: Greene and Clark Counties, Ohio; particularly Xenia and Wilberforce
- Part of the 1974 Super Outbreak and Tornadoes of 1974

The 1974 Xenia tornado was a large and extremely violent F5 tornado that destroyed portions of Xenia and Wilberforce, Ohio, in Metro Dayton, during the afternoon of April 3, 1974. It was the deadliest individual tornado of the 1974 Super Outbreak, the 24-hour period between April 3 and April 4, 1974, during which 148 tornadoes touched down in 13 different U.S. states. The Xenia tornado is considered one of the worst tornadoes in American history and has been a major driving force behind improvements to warning systems, alarms, and safety protocols across the United States. Across the state, 2,000 individuals were injured, 7,000 homes were destroyed, and 39 people were killed during the 1974 Super Outbreak, 32 of these deaths being in Xenia. Despite Ohio being better equipped for a tornadic disaster than many other states, a survey team from the National Oceanic and Atmospheric Administration (NOAA) found the lack of tornado sirens to be one of the leading causes of unpreparedness. This was one of two tornadoes to be assigned a preliminary F6 rating by Dr. Ted Fujita, the other being the 1970 Lubbock tornado; however, the rating was later downgraded to an F5, with maximum winds estimated at 305 MPH.

== Meteorological synopsis ==
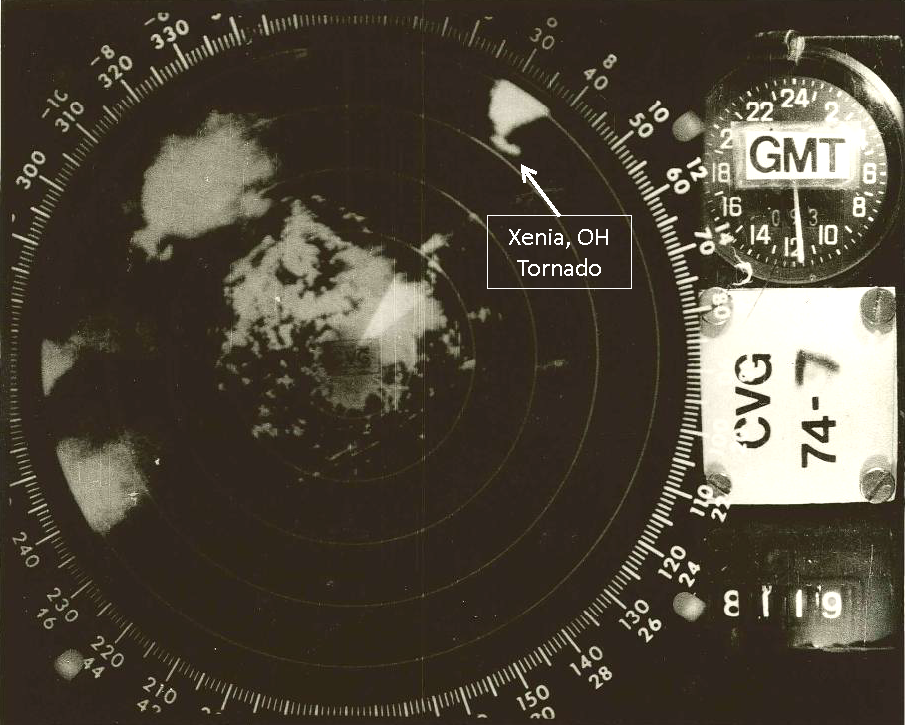
The 1974 Xenia tornado on radar, courtesy of the National Climatic Data Center

A powerful springtime low pressure system developed across the North American Interior Plains on April 2. While moving into the Mississippi and Ohio Valley areas, a surge of moist air originating from the Gulf of Mexico intensified the storm. There were sharp temperature contrasts between both sides of the system, creating very unstable weather conditions. Between the two outbreaks, an additional tornado was reported in Indiana on the morning of April 3, several hours before the official start of the outbreak. On April 3, severe weather watches were issued south of the Great Lakes, while in portions of the Upper Midwest, snow was reported, with heavy rain falling across central Michigan and most of Ontario.

== Tornado summary ==
The tornado formed near Bellbrook, Ohio, southwest of Xenia, at about 4:30 pm EDT. It began as a wispy, uncondensed tornado, gradually intensifying as it passed east of Bellbrook. At this time, the tornado was moving at a pace of about 50 mph (80 km/h). The tornado exhibited a multiple-vortex structure, described as a "pair of funnels coming together" by witnesses, and continued to increase in size and intensity as it approached town. Gil Whitney, the weather specialist for WHIO-TV in Dayton, alerted viewers in Montgomery and Greene Counties (where Xenia is located) about the possible tornado, broadcasting the radar image of the supercell with a pronounced hook echo on the rear flank of the storm several minutes before the tornado struck Xenia. The storm was visible on radar because of raindrops wrapping around the circulation. The massive tornado went into the western part of Xenia, completely flattening the Windsor Park and Arrowhead subdivisions at an intensity of F5 and sweeping away entire rows of brick homes with little debris left behind. Extensive wind-rowing of debris occurred in nearby fields.

When the storm reached central Xenia at 4:40 pm, apartment buildings, homes, businesses, churches, and schools—including Xenia High School—were destroyed. At this time, the tornado was videotaped and was observed to have "as many as five subvortices merging into one" tornado. Students in the school, practicing for a play, took cover in the main hallway seconds before the tornado dropped a school bus onto the stage where they had been practicing and extensively damaged the school building. Several railroad cars were lifted and blown over as the tornado passed over a moving Penn Central freight train in the center of town. It toppled headstones in Cherry Grove Cemetery, then moved through the downtown business district, passing west of the courthouse, which sustained some exterior damage. Numerous businesses in downtown Xenia were heavily damaged or destroyed, and several people were killed at the A&W Root Beer stand as the building was flattened. At the time, this was the state's highest tornadic death toll for a single building since 1953. Past downtown, the tornado continued into the Pinecrest Garden district.

The Xenia tornado was recorded on film by one resident, and its sound was recorded on tape by a Mr. Brokeshoulder from inside an apartment complex. Before the tornado hit the building, the resident left the tape recorder on, and it was found after the storm. At the same time, a few blocks away, 3 minutes and 21 seconds of footage were captured by 16-year-old Xenia resident Bruce Boyd with a "Super-8" 8mm movie camera, a pre-1973 model without sound recording capability. The footage was later paired with the nearby tape recording. Boyd's film shows multiple vortices within the larger circulation as the storm swept through Xenia. Upon exiting, the tornado passed through Wilberforce, heavily damaging several campus and residential buildings of Wilberforce University. Central State University sustained considerable damage, and a water tower was toppled. Afterwards, the tornado weakened before dissipating in Clark County near South Vienna, traveling approximately 30 miles (48 km). Its maximum width was a half-mile (0.8 km) in Xenia. The same parent storm spawned a weaker tornado northeast of Columbus in Franklin County. Thirty-two people died in the tornado, and about 1,150 were injured in Xenia, several of whom took proper shelter. In addition to fatalities, two Ohio Air National Guardsmen deployed for disaster assistance were killed on April 17 when a fire swept through their temporary barracks in a furniture store. The memorial in downtown Xenia lists 34 deaths in honor of the two Guardsmen. About 1,400 buildings, roughly half of the town, were damaged or destroyed. Damage was estimated at $250 million (equivalent to $1.63 billion in 2025).

== Aftermath ==
=== Community recovery ===
The impact of the tornado on the city of Xenia caused both emotional and physical damage. During the initial moments of the tornado, many feared for their own lives, as well as the lives of their families and friends. Cincinnati reporter Polk Laffoon noted, "In all, nine people lost their lives during those first few seconds...before it even did a fraction of the damage which made it so famous."

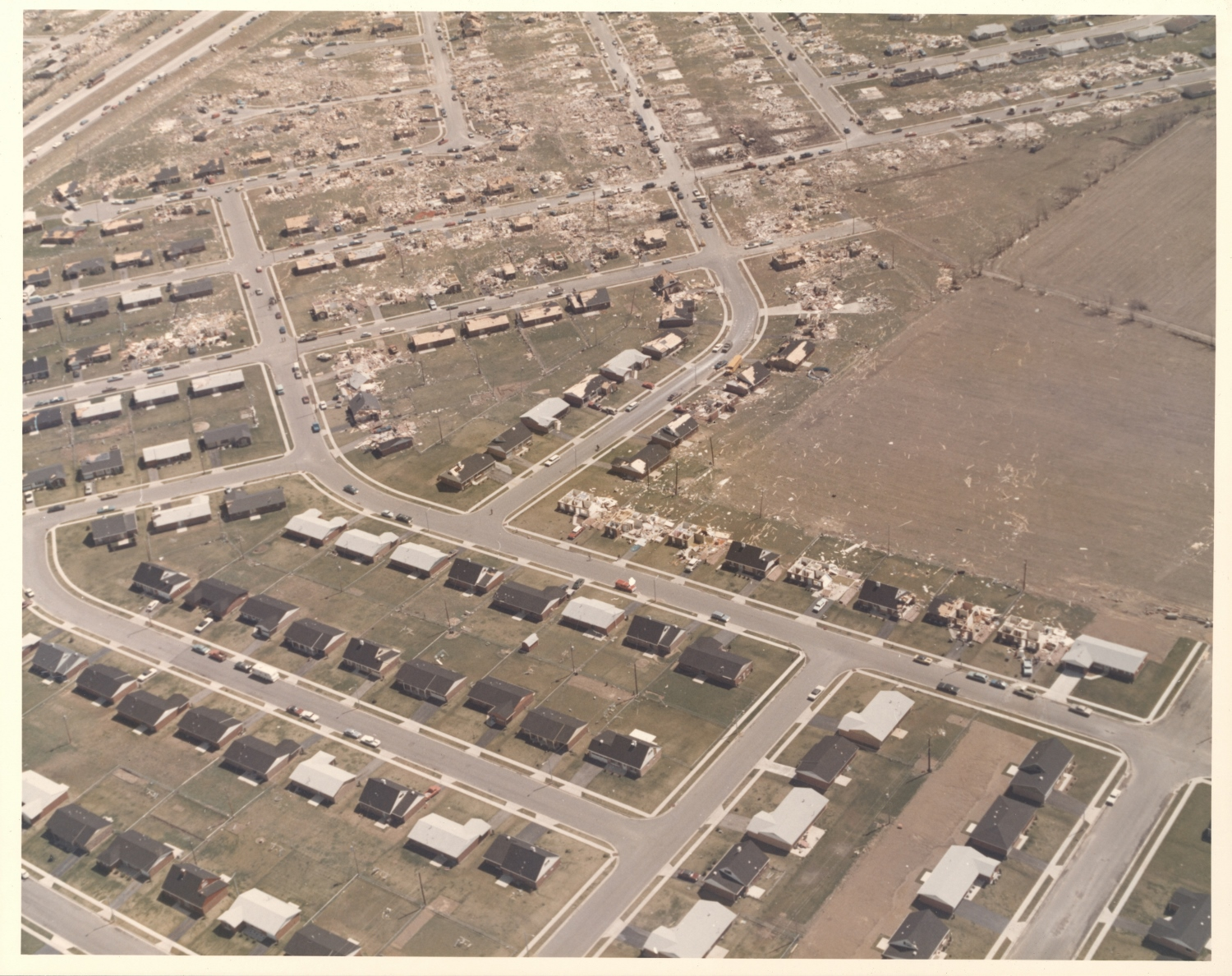
F5 damage to homes in the Arrowhead/Windsor Park area of Xenia

President Richard Nixon made an unannounced visit to Xenia a few days later. It would be the first and only city affected by the 1974 Super Outbreak that he would visit. Upon inspecting the damage, he said: "As I look back over the disasters, I saw the earthquake in Anchorage in 1964; I saw the hurricanes... Hurricane Camille in 1969 down in Mississippi, and I saw Hurricane Agnes in Wilkes-Barre, Pennsylvania. And it is hard to tell the difference among them all, but I would say in terms of destruction, just total devastation, this is the worst I have seen." President Nixon immediately declared Xenia a disaster area. Although the Federal Disaster Relief Act was already introduced in 1973, it had not passed Congress at the time. The 1974 Super Outbreak disaster was a catalyst for accelerated passage of the act through Congress in 1974, according to Nixon. It took several months for the city to recover from the tornado, with the help of the Red Cross, the Ohio National Guard, and the Department of Housing and Urban Development assisting the recovery efforts. By December 1974, federal and state assistance programs raised a total of $34.4 million. Shortly after, the Department of Transportation initiated a public transportation unit—X-line—to assist locals who had lost their primary means of transportation. Prior to the 1974 tornado, Xenia did not have any form of public transportation system.

In recognition of their coverage of the tornado under difficult circumstances, the staff of the Xenia Daily Gazette won the Pulitzer Prize for Spot News Reporting in 1975. The Xenia tornado was one of two rated F5 tornadoes that affected Ohio during the outbreak, the other striking the area of Cincinnati. Xenia was later struck by two other tornadoes—a small one in April 1989 and a large one in September 2000, which was an F4 tornado that killed one and injured about 100 in an area parallel to and north of the 1974 path.

=== Tornado preparedness ===
Following the 1974 Super Outbreak, NOAA attempted to implement an expansion of its Weather Radio, believing it would prevent the same devastating destruction in the event of another natural disaster. Unfortunately, the weather radio system received little attention throughout the 1970s and 1980s. The National Weather Service lacked funds and staff, leaving many cities to their own devices when it came to tornado preparedness. However, Xenia took it upon itself to ensure that in the event of another tornado, its citizens would be ready. Before the 1974 storm, the city had no tornado sirens. After the F5 tornado hit on April 3, 1974, ten sirens were installed across the area. Every building is required to have a clearly marked tornado shelter, and employees are required to know the proper actions to take during an emergency. Many of the buildings that were rebuilt immediately following the tornado took on the appearance of "concrete fortresses," focusing on safety rather than aesthetic. The Ohio Committee for Severe Weather Awareness (OCSWA) was established in 1978 with the mission of "...educating Ohioans about the natural disasters that typically affect the state..." Every spring, the OCSWA hosts Spring Severe Weather Awareness Week, which encourages schools and families to openly discuss disaster plans. Additionally, there is a statewide tornado drill held on the Wednesday of that week. In the state of Ohio, principals of local schools are required to ensure their students receive routine emergency protocol training six times per school year. Outside the school system, it is not uncommon to hear a tornado siren being tested weekly at noon on Mondays, Wednesdays, or Saturdays.

=== Preliminary F6 rating ===
Dr. Ted Fujita and a team of colleagues from the University of Chicago, University of Oklahoma, and National Severe Storms Laboratory, undertook a 10-month study of the 1974 Super Outbreak. Along with discovering new knowledge about tornadoes, such as downbursts and microbursts, and assessing damage to surrounding structures, the Xenia tornado was determined to be the worst out of 148 storms. Fujita initially assigned a preliminary rating of F6 intensity ± 1 scale.

== See also ==
- List of F5 and EF5 tornadoes
- Tornadoes of 1974
- 2000 Xenia tornado — an F4 tornado that also hit Xenia, Ohio, 26 years later after the F5
- List of notable media in the field of meteorology
- Gummo
