= 1974 Super Outbreak =

Second-largest tornado outbreak in United States history

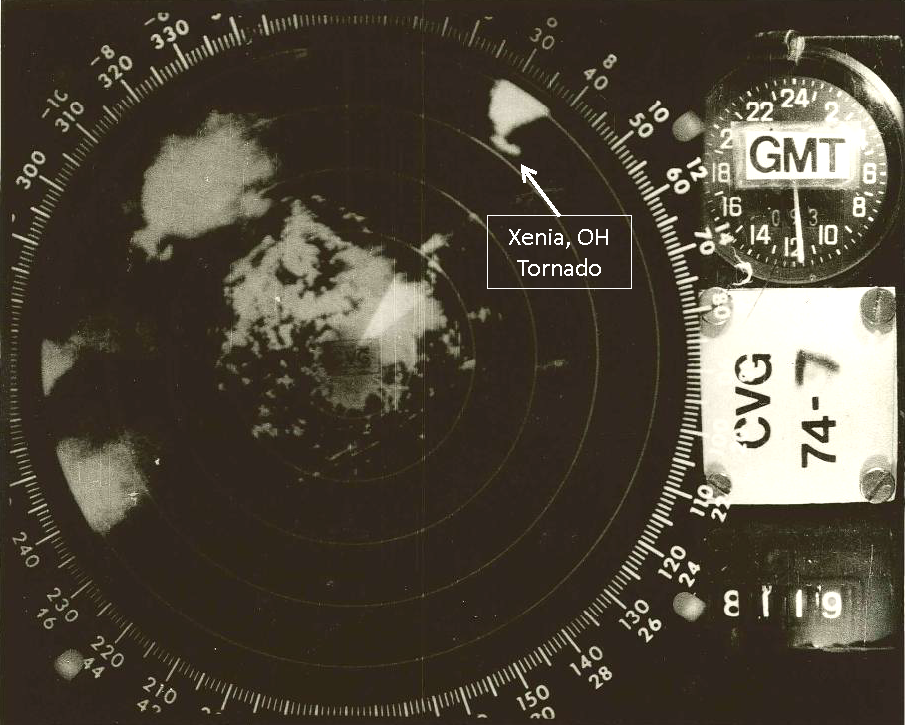
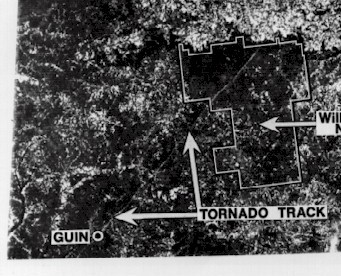
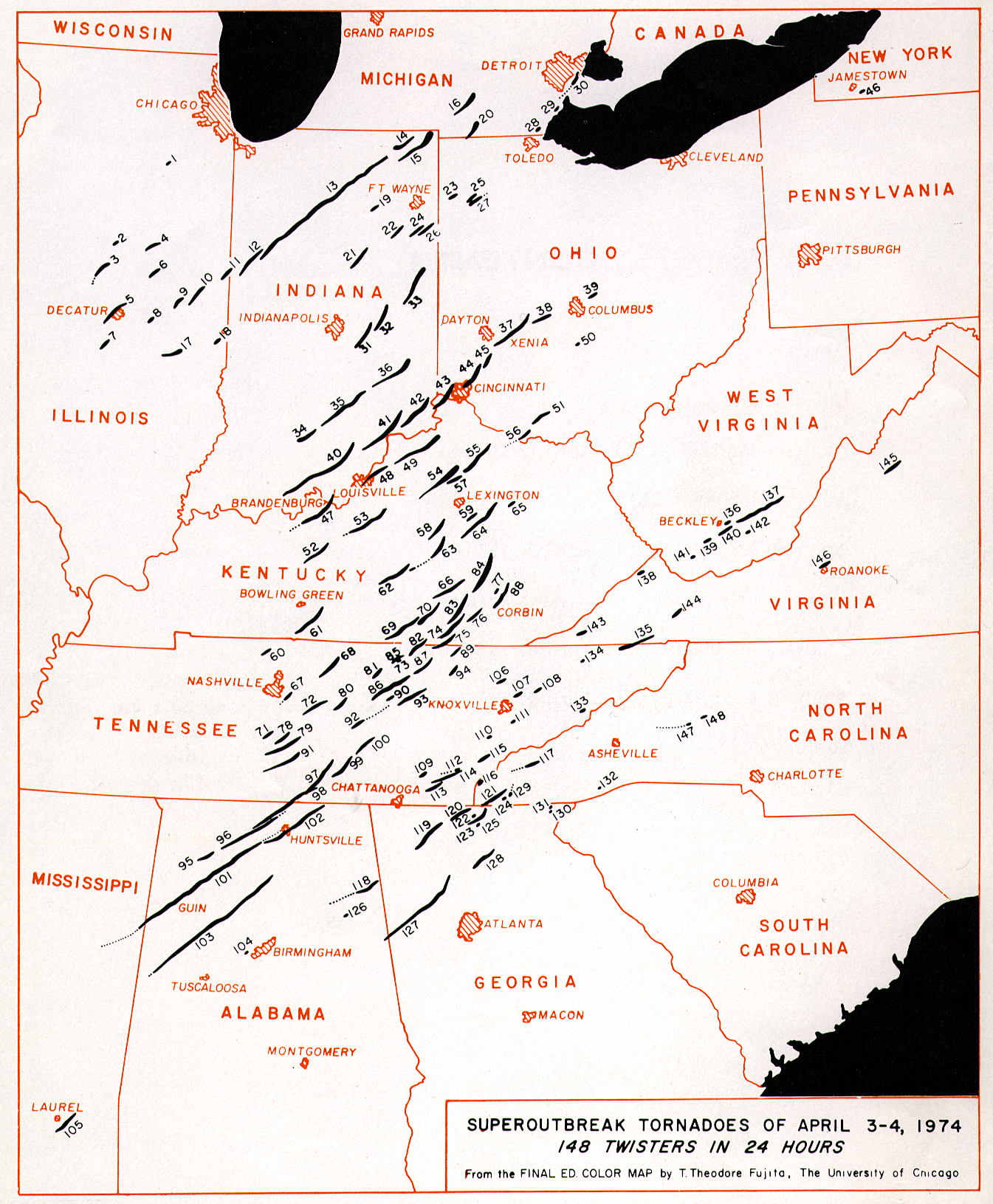
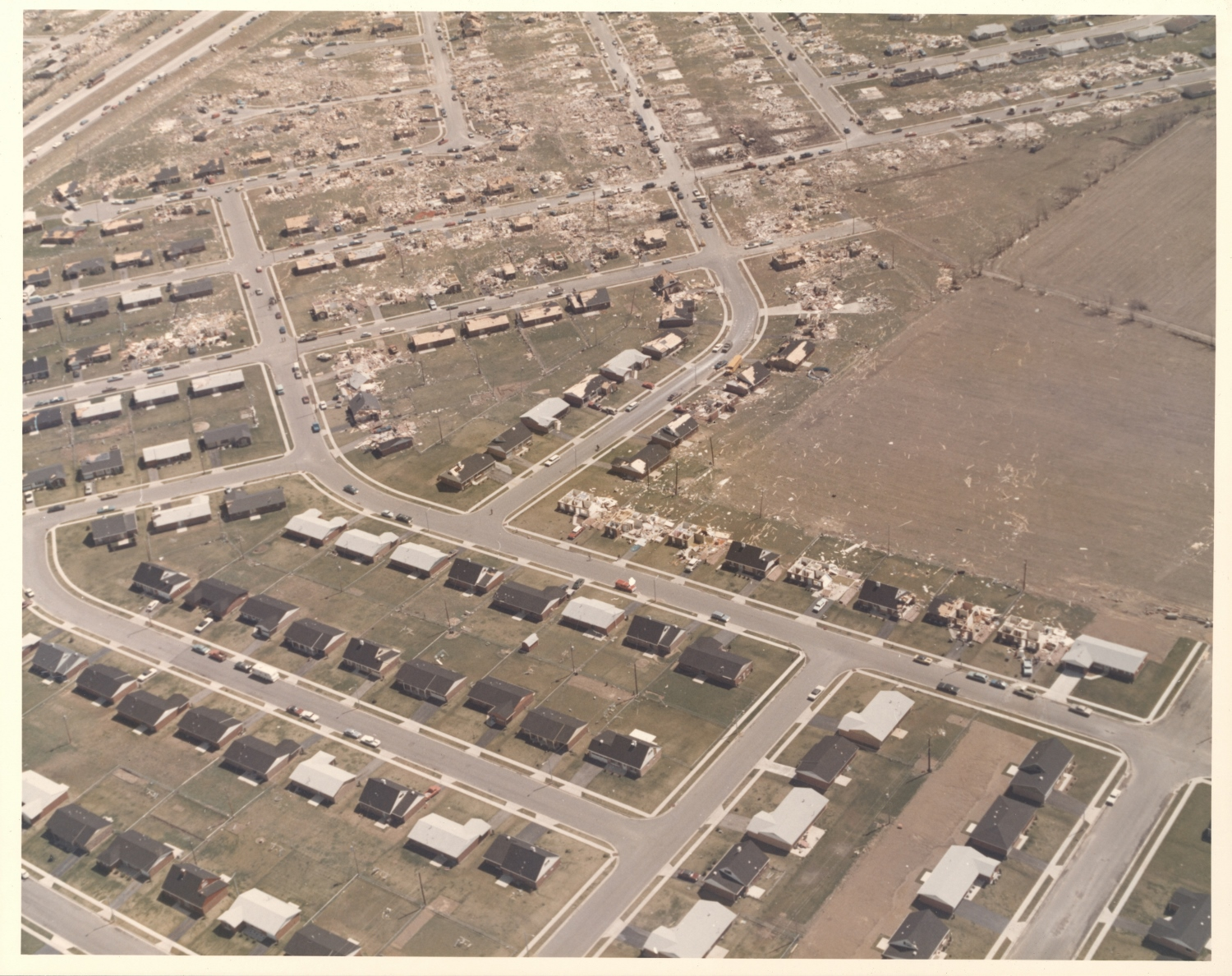
- Clockwise from top: Satellite image of the system responsible for the outbreak on April 3; F5 damage in Guin, Alabama, after a devastating tornado struck the town; aerial view of damage in Xenia, Ohio, after a devastating F5 tornado; paths of the 148 tornadoes generated in United States during the 1974 Super Outbreak (one tornado was unconfirmed and determined to be a microburst); radar image of supercells in Ohio, including the one that would produce the Xenia tornado

Meteorological history
- Duration: April 3–4, 1974

Tornado outbreak
- Tornadoes: 149 confirmed
- Max. rating: F5 tornado
- Duration: 1 day, 1 hour, 16 minutes
- Highest winds: Tornadic – 305 mph (491 km/h) (Xenia, Ohio F5 on April 3)
- Highest gusts: Non-tornadic – 85 mph (137 km/h) in Oklahoma
- Largest hail: 2.5 in (6.4 cm) at Abraham Lincoln Capital Airport, Illinois on April 3 (unverified report)

Extratropical cyclone
- Lowest pressure: 980 hPa (mbar); 28.94 inHg
- Max. rainfall: 3 inches (7.6 cm) in multiple locations

Blizzard
- Max. snowfall: 12 inches (30 cm) in multiple locations in Colorado

Overall effects
- Fatalities: 310–335 fatalities
- Injuries: 5,454–6,142 injuries
- Damage: $600 million (1974 USD) $4.10 billion (2026 USD)
- Areas affected: Midwestern and Southern United States, Ontario, Canada
- Part of the tornado outbreaks of 1974

The 1974 Super Outbreak was one of the most intense tornado outbreaks on record, occurring on April 3–4, 1974, across much of the United States. It was one of the deadliest tornado outbreaks in U.S. history. It was also the most violent tornado outbreak ever recorded, with 30 violent (F4 or F5 rated) tornadoes confirmed. On April 3–4, there were 149 tornadoes confirmed in 13 U.S. states and the Canadian province of Ontario. (Note: Originally, a series of studies by Fujita and his colleagues in 1974–75 recorded 148 tornadoes, but one of these was subsequently reclassified as a microburst. Only 147 of the original 148 tornadoes appear on the Storm Prediction Center's official database today.) In the United States, the tornadoes struck Illinois, Indiana, Michigan, Ohio, Kentucky, Tennessee, Alabama, Mississippi, Georgia, North Carolina, Virginia, West Virginia, and New York. The outbreak caused roughly $600 million USD (equivalent to $3.92 billion in 2025) in damage. The outbreak extensively damaged approximately 900 mi^{2} (2,331 km^{2}) along a total combined path length of 2,600 mi (4,184 km). At one point, as many as 15 separate tornadoes were occurring simultaneously.

The 1974 Super Outbreak was the first tornado outbreak in recorded history to produce more than 100 tornadoes in under a 24-hour period, a feat that was not repeated globally until the 1981 United Kingdom tornado outbreak and in the United States until the 2011 Super Outbreak, the largest outbreak on record by number of tornadoes in a 24-hour period. In 2023, tornado expert Thomas P. Grazulis created the outbreak intensity score (OIS) as a way to rank various tornado outbreaks. The 1974 Super Outbreak received an OIS of 578, making it the most intense tornado outbreak in recorded history.

== Meteorological synopsis ==
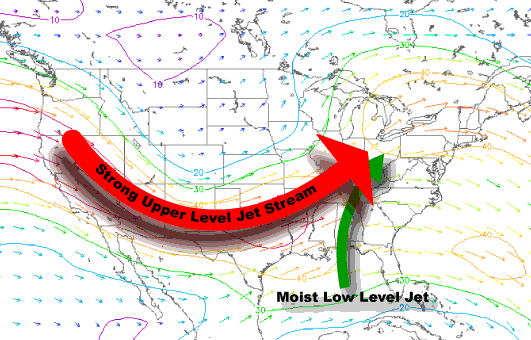
Upper-level winds during the Super Outbreak

A powerful springtime low pressure system developed across the North American Interior Plains on April 1. While moving into the Mississippi and Ohio Valley areas, a surge of unusually moist air intensified the storm further, while there were sharp temperature contrasts between both sides of the system. Officials at NOAA and in the National Weather Service forecast offices were expecting a severe weather outbreak on April 3, but not to the extent that ultimately occurred. Several F2 and F3 tornadoes had struck portions of the Ohio Valley and the South in a separate, earlier outbreak on April 1 and 2, which included three killer tornadoes in Kentucky, Alabama, and Tennessee. The town of Campbellsburg, northeast of Louisville, was hard-hit in this earlier outbreak, with a large portion of the town destroyed by an F3. Between the two outbreaks, an additional tornado was reported in Indiana in the early morning hours of April 3, several hours before the official start of the outbreak. On Wednesday, April 3, severe weather watches already were issued from the morning from south of the Great Lakes, while in portions of the Upper Midwest, snow was reported, with heavy rain falling across central Michigan and much of Ontario.

=== April 3 ===
==== Morning setup and convection ====
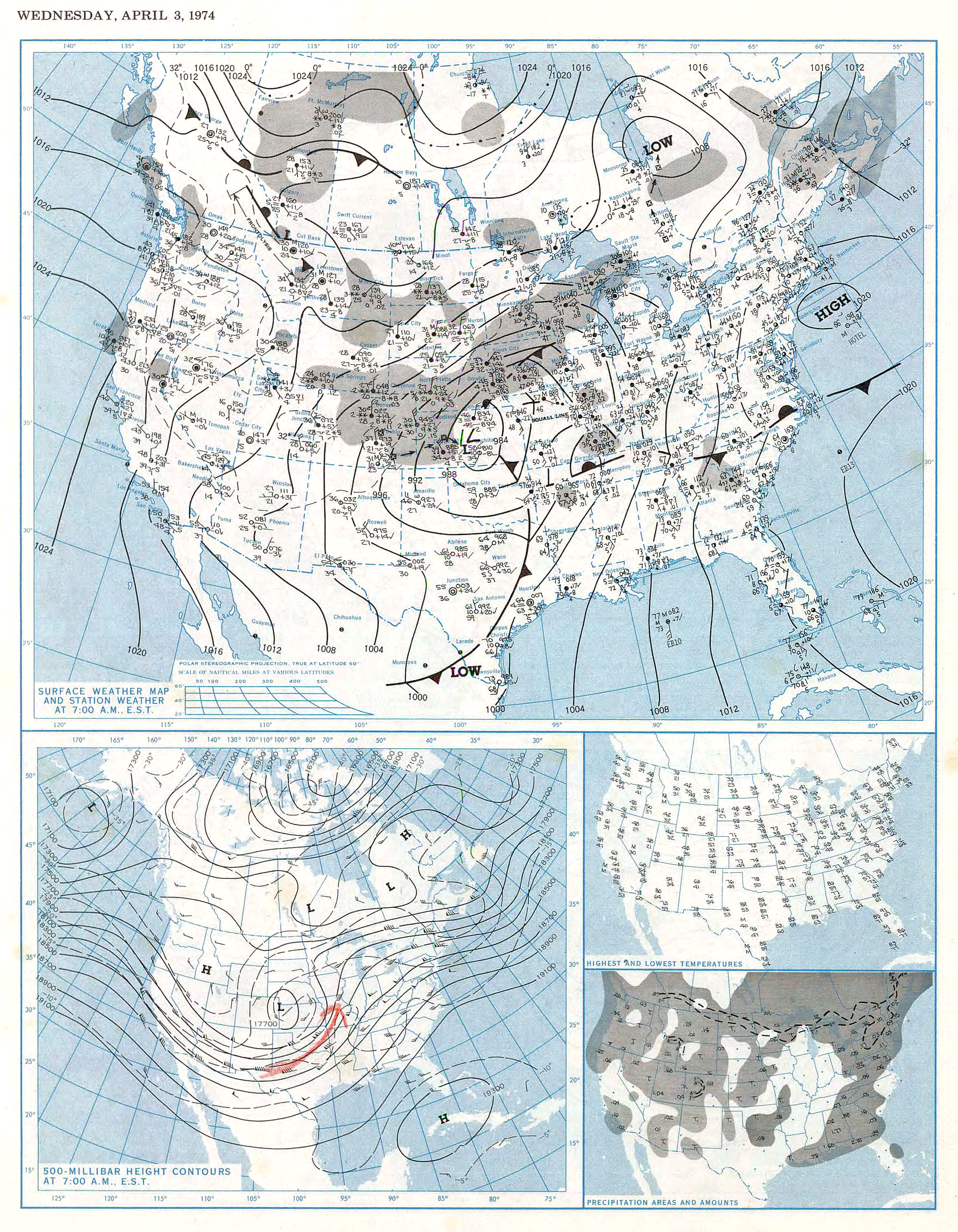
Surface weather analysis on April 3

By 12:00 UTC on April 3, a large-scale trough extended over most of the contiguous United States, with several modest shortwaves rotating around the broad base of the trough. The mid-latitude low-pressure center over Kansas continued to deepen to 980 mb (28.94 inHg), and wind speeds at the 850-mb level increased to 50 kn (58 mph) (25.7 m/s (93 km/h)) over portions of Louisiana, Mississippi, and Alabama. Due to significant moisture advection, destabilization rapidly proceeded apace; the warm front near the Gulf Coast dissipated and then redeveloped northward over the Ohio River valley. Consequently, CAPE levels in the region rose to 1,000 J/kg. However, a warm temperature plume in the elevated mixed layer kept thunderstorms from initiating at the surface. Meanwhile, a large mesoscale convective system (MCS) that had developed overnight in Arkansas continued to strengthen due to strong environmental lapse rates. Later in the day, strong daytime heating caused instability to further rise. By 18:00 UTC, CAPE values in excess of 2,500 J/kg were present over the lower Ohio and the Mississippi Valley. As wind speeds in the troposphere increased, Large-scale lifting overspread the warm sector. At the same time, the forward-propagating MCS spread into the Tennessee and Ohio valleys, where it evolved into the first of three main convection bands that produced tornadoes. This first convective band moved rapidly northeast, at times reaching speeds of about 60 kn (69 mph) (30.9 m/s (111 km/h)). However, thunderstorm activity, for the moment, remained mostly elevated in nature.

==== Afternoon supercells ====
Fatalities by state/province
State/province	Fatalities
Alabama	77
Georgia	16
Illinois	5
Indiana	47
Kentucky	71
Michigan	2
North Carolina	6
Ohio	38
Ontario	9
Tennessee	45
Virginia	1
West Virginia	1
Total	319

By 16:30 UTC, the large MCS began to splinter into two sections: the southern part slowed, lagging into southeast Tennessee, while the northern part accelerated, reaching Pennsylvania by 19:30 UTC. The split was related to several factors, including a band of subsidence over eastern Kentucky and western West Virginia; local downslope winds over the Appalachians; and an inversion over the same area. These factors allowed the northern part of the MCS to accelerate due to efficient ducting, while the southern part slowed as the boundary layer warmed and moistened. Numerous surface-based supercells began to develop in the southern area, beginning with one that produced an F3 tornado at about 16:30 UTC near Cleveland, Tennessee. Meanwhile, a new band of scattered thunderstorms developed at 15:00 UTC over eastern Arkansas and Missouri; over the next four hours, this band became the focus for several intense supercells, starting in eastern Illinois and southern Indiana. In the wake of the MCS, backing low-level winds, rapid diurnal destabilization, and perhaps cool, mid-level advection had occurred over the warm sector, weakening the convective inhibition (CINH) layer, and favorable wind profiles bolstered helicity to over 230 m^{2}/s²—a combination of factors conducive to tornadogenesis. Consequently, the storms increased in intensity and coverage as they moved into Illinois, Indiana, and northern Kentucky, producing several tornadoes, including the first F5 tornado of the day, at 19:20 UTC, near Depauw, Indiana. Several of the storms to form between 19:20 and 20:20 UTC became significant, long-lived supercells, producing many strong or violent tornadoes, including three F5s at Depauw; Xenia, Ohio; and Brandenburg, Kentucky. These storms formed the second of three convective bands to generate tornadoes.

While violent tornado activity increased over the warm sector, a third band of convection developed at about 16:00 UTC and extended from near St. Louis into west-central Illinois. Based upon real-time satellite imagery and model data, differential positive vorticity advection coincided with the left exit region of an upper-level jet streak which reached wind speeds of up to 130 kn (150 mph) (66.9 m/s (241 km/h)), thereby enhancing thunderstorm growth. Storms grew rapidly in height and extent, producing baseball-sized hail by 17:20 UTC in Illinois and, shortly thereafter, in St. Louis, Missouri, which reported a very severe thunderstorm early in the afternoon that, while not producing a tornado, was the costliest storm to hit the city up to that time. By 19:50 UTC, supercells producing F3 tornadoes hit the Decatur and Normal areas in Illinois. As thunderstorms moved into the warmer, moister air mass over eastern Illinois and Indiana, they produced longer-lived tornadoes—one of which began near Otterbein and ended near Valentine in Indiana, a distance of 121 miles (195 km).

==== Continued activity ====
Meanwhile, by 00:00 UTC the southern half of the first convective band became indistinguishable from new convection that had formed farther south over Alabama and Tennessee in connection with convective band two. In this area, increasing west-southwesterly wind shear at all levels of the troposphere, juxtaposed over near-parallel outflow boundaries, allowed successive supercells, all producing strong, long-tracked tornadoes, to develop unconstrained by their outflow in a broad region from eastern Mississippi to southern Tennessee. These storms, forming after 23:00 UTC, produced some of the most powerful tornadoes of the outbreak, including a large and long-tracked F4 that struck the western and central portions of Alabama, tracking for just over 110 miles (180 km), two F5s that both slammed into Tanner, causing extensive fatalities, an extremely potent F5 that devastated Guin in Alabama, and multiple violent, deadly tornadoes that affected and caused fatalities in Tennessee.

=== April 4 ===
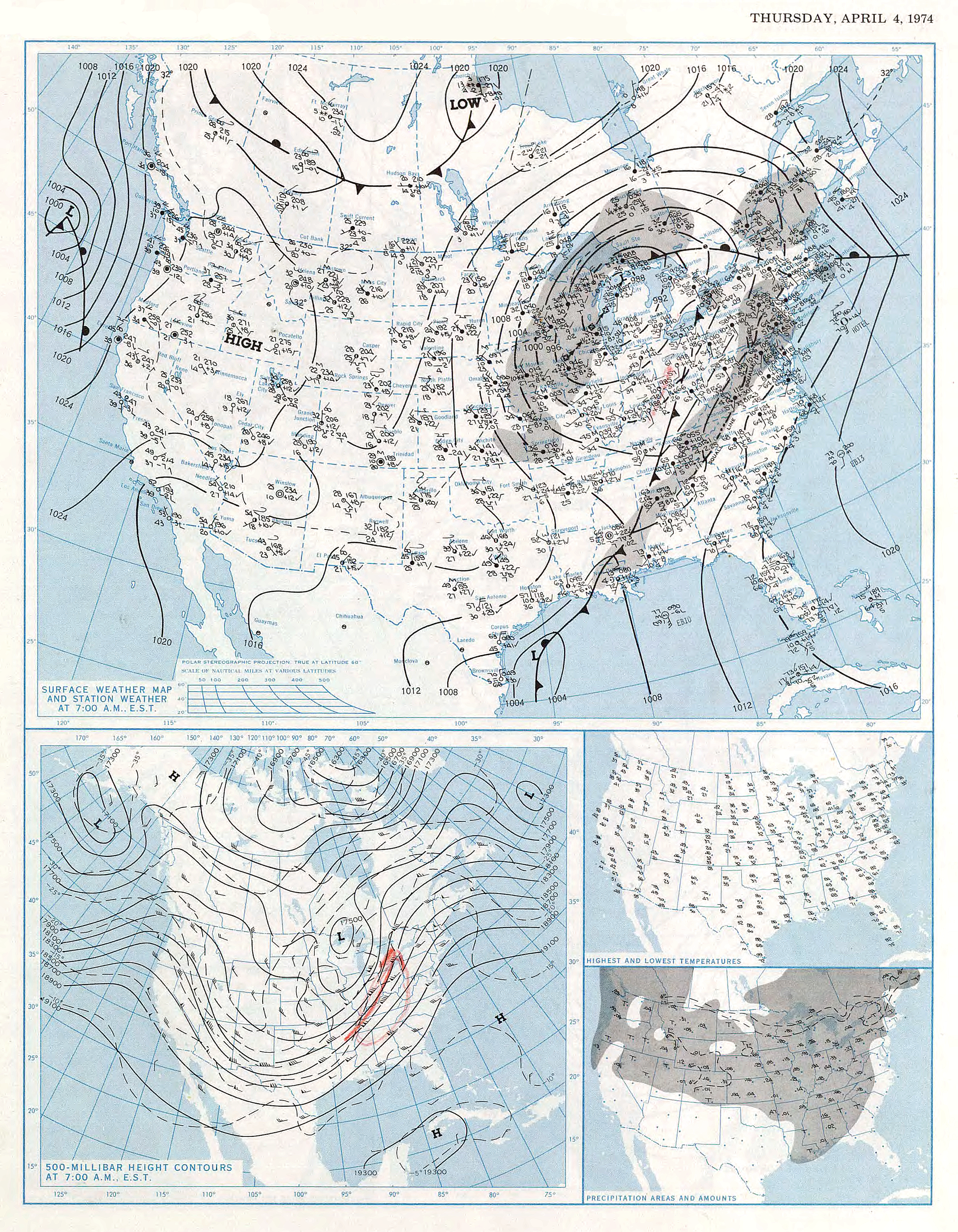
Surface weather analysis on April 4

Michigan was not hit as hard as neighboring states or Windsor, although one deadly tornado hit near Coldwater and Hillsdale, killing people in mobile homes; however, thunderstorm downpours caused flash floods, and north of the warm front in the Upper Peninsula, heavy snowfall was reported. Activity in the south moved towards the Appalachians during the overnight hours and produced the final tornadoes across the southeast during the morning of April 4. A series of studies by Dr. Tetsuya T. Fujita in 1974–75—which were later cited in a 2004 survey by Risk Management Solutions—found that three-quarters of all tornadoes in the 1974 Super Outbreak were produced by 30 'families' of tornadoes—multiple tornadoes spawned in succession by a single thunderstorm cell. The majority of these were long-lived and long-tracked individual supercells.

== Confirmed tornadoes ==
Daily statistics during the 1974 Super Outbreak
Date	Total	Fujita scale rating (Note: The Fujita Scale (F-scale) was used to rate tornado damage from its introduction in the late-1970s through February 1, 2007, when it was succeeded by the Enhanced Fujita Scale (EF-scale). Tornado ratings were retroactively applied to events prior to the formal adoption of the F-scale by the National Weather Service.)						Deaths	Injuries
Date	Total	F0	F1	F2	F3	F4	F5	Deaths	Injuries
April 3	130	12	24	33	31	23	7	10–11	211–254
April 4	19	6	8	2	3	0	0		—N/a
Total	149	F0 18	F1 32	F2 35	F3 34*	F4 23	F5 7	310–335	5,454–6,142

- Note: An F3 tornado was confirmed in Ontario.

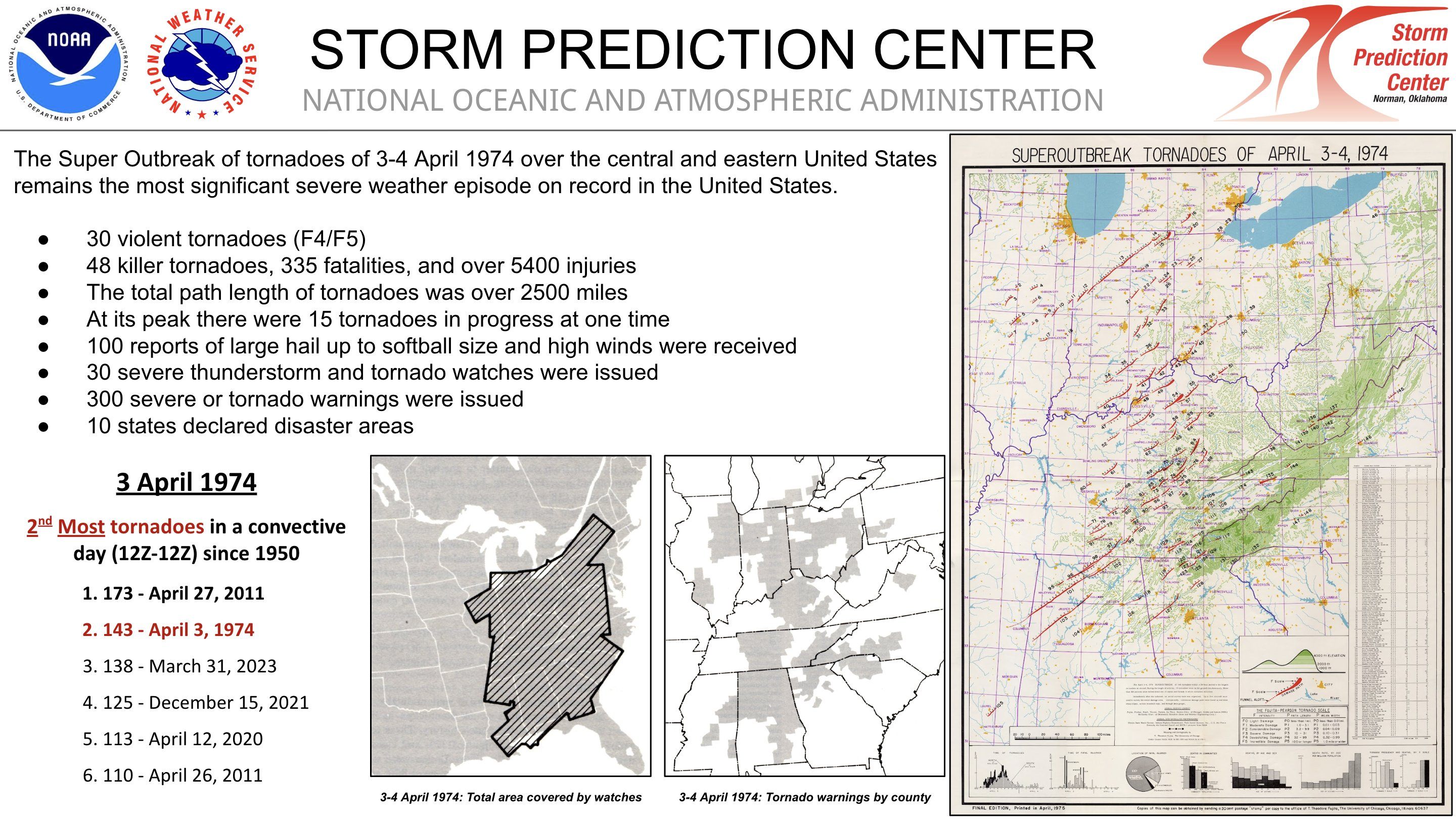
A graphic made by the Storm Prediction Center on the 50th anniversary of the Super Outbreak

This tornado outbreak produced the most violent (F4 and F5) tornadoes ever observed in a single tornado outbreak. There were seven F5 tornadoes and 23 F4 tornadoes. More than 100 tornadoes associated with 33 tornado families. The first tornado of the outbreak is disputed, with some sources indicating an isolated F2 in Indiana at 13:30 UTC while Fujita marked the outbreak's onset at 18:10 UTC with an F0 in Illinois. As the storm system moved east where daytime heating had made the air more unstable, the tornadoes grew more intense. A tornado that struck near Monticello, Indiana, was an F4 and had a path length of 121 miles (195 km), the longest path length of any tornado for this outbreak. A total of 19 people were killed in this tornado. The first F5 tornado of the day struck the city of Depauw, Indiana, at 3:20 pm EDT. It killed 6 and injured 86 others along its 65-mile path, leveling and sweeping away homes in Depauw and Daisy Hill.

Seven F5 tornadoes were observed—one each in Indiana, Ohio, and Kentucky, three in Alabama, and the final one which crossed through parts of Indiana, Ohio, and Kentucky. Thirty-one people were killed in Brandenburg, Kentucky, and 28 died in Guin, Alabama. An F3 tornado also occurred in Windsor, Ontario, Canada, killing nine and injuring 30 others there, all of them at the former Windsor Curling Club.

There were 18 hours of nearly continuous tornado activity that ended in Caldwell County, North Carolina, at about 7:00 am on April 4. A total of 319 were killed in 148 tornadoes from April 3 through April 4 and 5,484 were injured.

The 1974 Super Outbreak occurred at the end of a very strong, nearly record-setting La Niña event. The 1973–74 La Niña was just as strong as the 1998–99 La Niña. Despite the apparent connection between La Niña and two of the largest tornado outbreaks in United States history, no definitive linkage exists between La Niña and this outbreak or tornado activity in general. Some tornado myths were soundly debunked (not necessarily for the first time) by tornado activity during the outbreak.

The most prolific and longest-lasting tornado family of the outbreak tracked from central Illinois and the entirety of northern Indiana from 2:47 p.m. to 6:59 p.m. (UTC−05:00), a span of 4 hours and 12 minutes. Eight tornadoes touched down, including the longest-tracked single tornado of the outbreak: the 121 mi (195 km) F4 Monticello tornado. However, that tornado may itself have been composed of three individual F4 tornadoes.

=== Depauw–Martinsburg–Daisy Hill, Indiana ===
Depauw–Martinsburg–Daisy Hill, Indiana
- The un-condensed tornado seen shortly after leaving Depauw as seen from New Salisbury, Indiana

Meteorological history
- Formed: April 3, 1974, 2:16 p.m. CDT (UTC−05:00)
- Dissipated: April 3, 1974, 3:25 p.m. CDT (UTC−05:00)
- Duration: 1 hour and 9 minutes

F5 tornado
- on the Fujita scale

Overall effects
- Casualties: 6 fatalities, 76 injuries

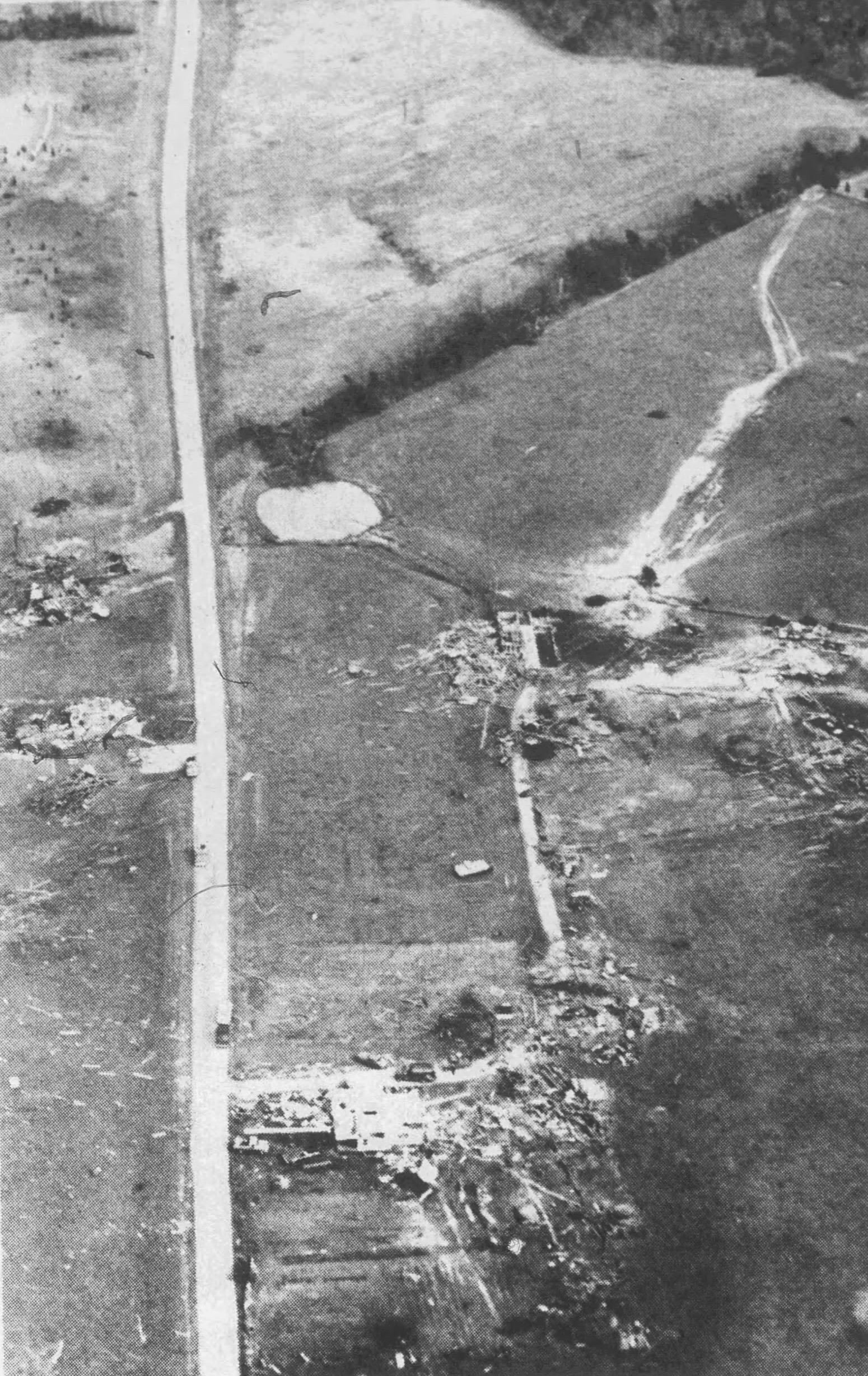
Damage near Depauw, Indiana.

This was the first in a series of five consecutive violent tornadoes produced by a single supercell from southern Indiana into extreme northern Kentucky and then southwestern Ohio. It was also the first F5 tornado out of the seven during the outbreak. The tornado initially touched down south of Huffman around 2:16 p.m. CDT and moved along an east-northeast to northeast path. One person died near the origin point when their mobile home was destroyed. Southeast of Branchville, one person died and another was injured while sheltering in a ditch. The bus they were previously in was thrown 50 ft (15 m) into the ditch and crushed them. In Crawford County, the tornado grew to over 1 mi (1.6 km). It skirted by several smaller communities but completely destroyed many rural farms. It struck southeastern portions of Depauw, killing one person. While moving through Depauw, no condensation funnel was observed with the tornado despite its intensity and remained that way as it moved into Martinsburg. Another person was killed east of Palmyra. In Washington County, the tornado moved directly through Martinsburg, destroying 38 out of 48 homes in the town. The Indianapolis News described the town as "for all practical purposes is no longer there". Numerous trees were completely stripped of their branches and debarked. The tornado soon struck Daisy Hill where several homes were completely swept away. It ultimately dissipated near New Liberty around 3:25 p.m. CDT after traveling 62 mi (100 km).

=== Decatur, Illinois ===
Decatur, Illinois
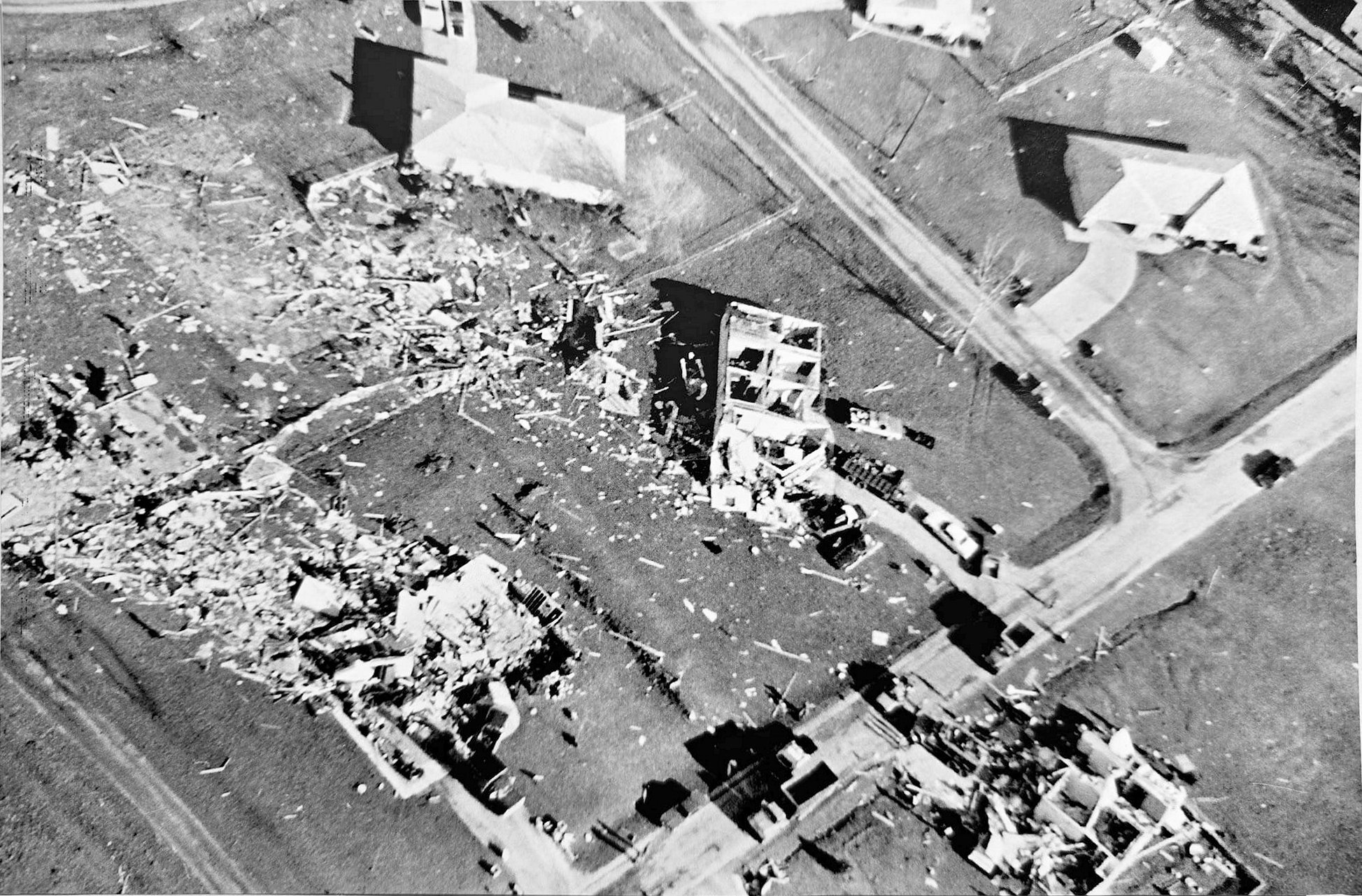
- Aerial photo showing damage to homes in Decatur

Meteorological history
- Formed: April 3, 1974, 2:30 p.m. CDT (UTC−05:00)
- Dissipated: April 3, 1974, 2:50 p.m. CDT (UTC−05:00)
- Duration: 20 minutes

F3 tornado
- on the Fujita scale

Overall effects
- Casualties: 1 fatality, ≥26 injuries
- Damage: $3.2 million (1974 USD)

This tornado touched down just north of the Sangamon River and traveled along an east-northeast trajectory, damaging several homes as it moved toward Decatur. Residents in the area reported two funnels as the tornado intensified. Many homes were damaged near Wyckles Corners in western Decatur. Many trees were left "mangled and twisted" in the area. After crossing the cloverleaf interchange between I-72 and US 51, it moved across a sparsely populated area of farmland. The few homes that were struck in this area were obliterated as aerial surveys shows concrete slabs and exposed basements and debris strewn across open fields. The tornado then traversed IL-121 and struck the Macon County Fairgrounds. Near the fairgrounds, one person was killed and another was injured when their mobile home was thrown into a tree and torn apart. At the Macon County Fairgrounds an exhibit housing 21 boats and 2 campers was destroyed and three barns were destroyed; losses reached $100,000. Along Shadow Lane, 26 homes were heavily damaged and 8 others were impacted. A section of a concrete bridge was dislodged and lifted at a construction site along I-72. Across its path, the tornado destroyed 55 homes and damaged 106 others with total losses amounting to $3.2 million. A total 26 people were hospitalized but the full extent of injuries is unspecified.

The tornado struck Decatur without warning around 2:45 p.m. CST. A severe thunderstorm warning was issued at 2:43 p.m., tornado sirens were sounded at 2:48 p.m., and a tornado warning wasn't issued until 2:56 p.m. by which time the tornado had cleared Decatur and dissipated near US 51. Local police established two command posts and dispatched officers, including off duty and auxiliary, to Decatur for patrol duties. Fifteen firefighters were deployed to check for fires and assist with downed wires while the street division assisted with debris removal. Representative Edward Rell Madigan (R-IL) pledged all possible assistance to victims. Electrical service was restored to the city by 8:00 a.m. on April 4, with the exception of 35 homes. Cablevision service remained offline due to damaged wires. The American Red Cross set up a relief headquarters at Boling Springs Church of God with two coordinators assisting victims with federal assistance paperwork. A canteen operated by the Salvation Army provided food and Catholic Charities distributed clothing. The Council of Community Services was likely to head long-term relief efforts. All roads in the city were cleared by April 5. The tornado prompted the addition of additional procedures to an in-the-works emergency preparedness program which would now include the Inspection and Public Works Department. Faster emergency medical response was identified as a pressing issue and plans to have a mobile headquarters were made. The Macon County Fairgrounds president sought state aid to repair the facility.

On April 5, 300–400 volunteers, including farmers from DeWitt and Moultrie counties, gathered at the fairgrounds to help with clean up across the city. Heavy machinery was used by city crews in the hardest-hit areas while the volunteers focused on less damaged areas. Volunteer work concluded on April 7 with more than 2,000 people assisting during the four-day period. Several people suffered cuts from sheet metal while clearing debris. The tornado was described as the worst to ever hit Decatur.

=== Parker City, Indiana, tornado family ===
The Parker City, Indiana tornado family
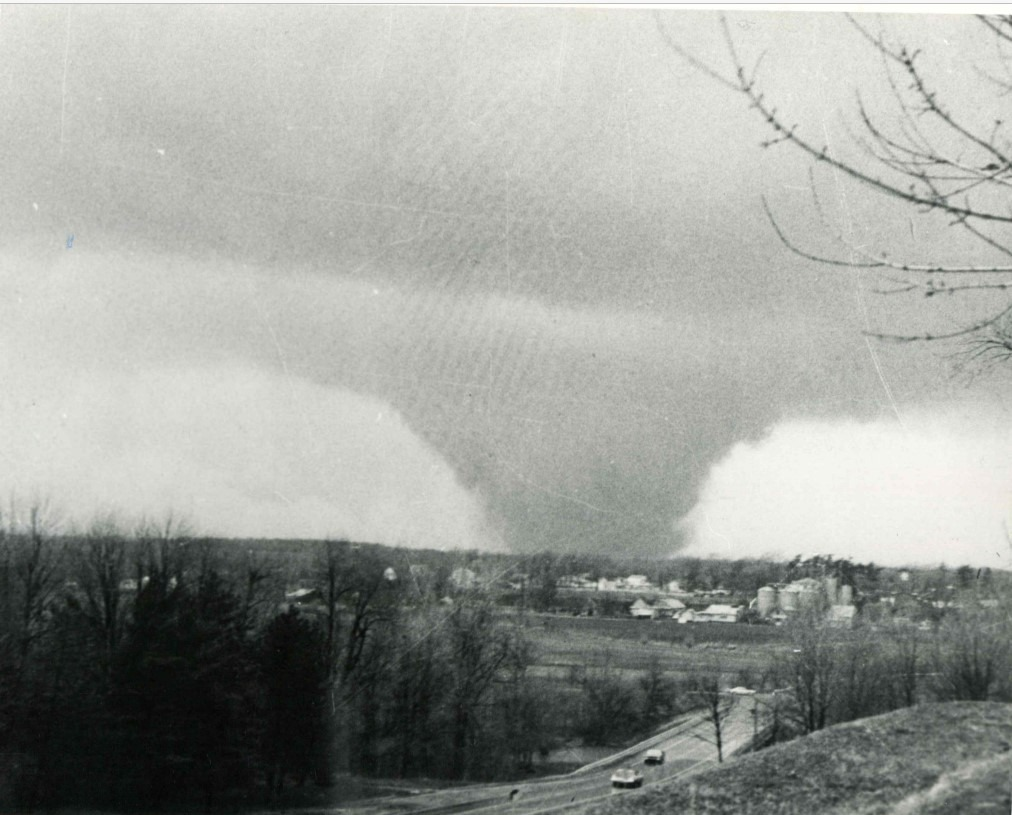
- The second tornado of the family near Knightstown, Indiana. This tornado would later strike the town of Kennard.

Meteorological history
- Formed: April 3, 1974, 2:50 p.m. (UTC−05:00)
- Dissipated: April 3, 1974, 3:58 p.m. (UTC−05:00)
- Duration: 1 hour, 8 minutes

Overall effects
- Fatalities: 2
- Injuries: 54
- Damage: >$10 million (1974 USD)
- Areas affected: Indiana

Tornado family
- Tornadoes: 3 confirmed
- Max. rating: F4 tornado
- Duration: 1 hour, 8 minutes
- Highest gusts: 284 mph (457 km/h)

Confirmed tornadoes by Fujita rating
FU	F0	F1	F2	F3	F4	F5	Total
0	0	0	0	1	2	0	3

These three tornadoes in east-central Indiana were part of the seventh tornado family described by Abbey and Fujita 1981. Agee et al. 1976 described it as a Type II-A family, indicating cyclical tornadoes that turn left as a new tornado forms. Twin circulations rotated around within the supercell as the tornadoes formed and dissipated. Observations of the storm indicated a broad wall cloud with a smaller "pedestal cloud" extending down throughout its existence. A clear condensation funnel was not always observed, but the pedestal cloud would periodically descend and merge with debris clouds rising from the ground. Agee et al. 1976 estimated the condensation funnel to have reached 330 yd (300 m) at the ground with damaging winds extending 3,000 ft (1,000 yd). The parent supercell was initially observed over central Indiana, with a funnel cloud sighted around 2:15 p.m. CDT to the northeast of Bloomington in Monroe County. A larger funnel cloud was observed over Johnson County from 2:20 to 2:30 p.m CDT. At 2:50 p.m. CDT, the first tornado of the family touched down near Fairland in Shelby County. The tornado struck Fountaintown, destroying 11 homes. Twenty-five people were injured, five of whom required hospitalization. It continued along a northeast to north-northeast path into Hancock County and struck Stringtown around 3:07 p.m. CDT. A church had its roof torn off, five homes were damaged, and a bus was lofted into a tree. The tornado subsequently dissipated at 3:10 p.m. CDT after traveling 17 mi (27 km). It was rated F3 at its peak. The Storm Data publication states this tornado was larger than the subsequent F4 tornado, with a width of 1 mi (1.6 km); Grazulis lists a mean width of 400 yd (370 m).

As the tornado hooked left and dissipated, a new tornado formed farther east at 3:02 p.m. CDT to the southwest of Charlottesville in Hancock County. It initially moved on a northeast trajectory toward the O'Neal Trailer Court about 2 mi (3.2 km) south of Charlottesville along the Hancock-Rush County line. All eleven mobile homes were obliterated, with debris scattered up to 1 mi (1.6 km) away; only bent frames of two and part of a third were found while the remainder were completely swept away. At least seven people were injured here, many found in ditches across the street. East of Charlottesville along US 40, a two-story brick home was leveled with only the entry steps left behind. Heading toward Knightstown, it abruptly turned more to the north and bypassed the town to the west resulting in damage to only a few homes. As it continued across southwestern Henry County, it struck a truck stop near I-70 and IN 109 before traversing rural farmland. Two vehicles, one being a semi-trailer, were thrown from I-70. Farmsteads were entirely leveled and trees were uprooted. Damage across Rush County was estimated at $5 million. It then moved directly through Grant City in Henry County, destroying 11 of the town's 25 homes and damaging the rest. Four people were injured in the community. After crossing more farmland, newspaper reports indicate the tornado lifted as it approached Kennard, only to touch back down on the west side of town. Kennard suffered extensive damage with 70 percent of the town damaged or destroyed; much of the northern portion of town was severely damaged. Homes in the town were leveled, with 48 destroyed overall, and the upper half of a two-story brick elementary school was swept away A pregnant woman was injured and subsequently had a premature birth; the infant did not survive. Seventeen people were injured. Northeast of Kennard, more farms were damaged. Between Mount Summit and Mooreland, the ceiling of a high school collapsed. The tornado dissipated at 3:20 p.m. CDT after traveling 20 mi (32 km). It was rated F4 at its peak.

The final tornado originated near US 35 around 3:35 p.m. CDT and traveled north-northeast. Between Parker City and Farmland along SR 32, the tornado reached a width of 1 mi (1.6 km) and featured four vortices circulating around each other. Based on video evidence, Grazulis approximated the tornado may have had winds of 210 mph (340 km/h) aloft within one of the vortices. This was based on the forward speed of the tornado, the velocities of the smaller vortices rotating around the mean center of the tornado, their velocity rotating around each other. In this area the Monroe Central Junior-Senior High School (a large, steel-reinforced building) was mostly destroyed. The Muncie Star stated "a greater tragedy was avoided" as hundreds of students were dismissed to go home just 20 minutes before the tornado struck. Only the principal and several teachers remained, taking refuge in the boiler room. All east-facing walls and large portions of the roof of the school collapsed. Nine cars were thrown into the building from the parking lot. Damage to the school alone was estimated at $3–7 million. On the other side of SR 32, 5 homes were destroyed and 14 others were damaged. One person was killed here. Throughout the path, wide swaths of trees were stripped of their branches and debarked. The tornado dissipated at 3:58 p.m. CDT after traveling 22 mi (35 km); it was rated F4 at its peak.

Collectively, the tornadoes killed 2 people, injured 54, and inflicted well over $10 million in damage. The Carthage Volunteer Fire Department set up clothing donations for victims in Charlottesville and the Red Cross provided food. In the immediate aftermath, emergency responders in Kennard were unable to coordinate due to the lack of a command center. Looting was reported before county police arrived. An estimated 300 sightseers clogged roadways into the community. Fifty-eight members of the National Guard arrived in Kennard for search and rescue and clean up. The Red Cross assisted residents with applying for relief aid, with 20 volunteers arriving within a day of the tornado. Displaced persons were sheltered at a community center and elementary school in Greensboro.

=== Hanover–Madison, Indiana ===
Hanover–Madison, Indiana
- The tornado approaching Hanover, Indiana

Meteorological history
- Formed: April 3, 1974, 3:19 p.m. CDT (UTC-5:00)
- Dissipated: April 3, 1974, 4:06 p.m. CDT (UTC-5:00)
- Duration: 47 minutes

F4 tornado
- on the Fujita scale

Overall effects
- Casualties: 11 fatalities, 190 injuries
- Damage: $35 million (1974 USD)

As the Depauw F5 tornado weakened, the same supercell spawned a second tornado to the east at 3:19 p.m. just northeast of Henryville in Clark County. It moved generally east-northeast and entered Scott County, killing one person there. As the tornado approached Chelsea, it grew to an estimated 0.75 to 1 mi (1.21 to 1.61 km) wide and swept away many homes. Doctors at the Madison State Hospital observed two funnels merge as the tornado struck Hanover. Hanover College was largely destroyed; a few students were injured and damage to the college alone reached $10 million. At a housing development in Hanover, 71 of the community's 75 homes were leveled with a state trooper likening the destruction to an "[atomic] bomb testing ground".

The tornado reached its peak strength as it struck Madison where large, expensive homes were completely destroyed. Roughly 300 homes were destroyed in northern Madison and seven people were killed. The six-story Indiana-Kentucky Electric Company Clifty Creek Power Plant was almost completely leveled north of Madison, with only three smokestacks left standing amid a two-story pile of debris. A large swath of trees were "snapped and crushed" nearby the plant. The Madison State Hospital suffered $600,000 in damage, with one patient and several maintenance buildings were destroyed. Three people were killed near China.

A total of 11 people were killed, 190 others were injured, and damage reached $35 million. Doctors from the damaged Madison State Hospital were sent to Hanover to assist victims; 30 people were rescued from basements. The hospital provided shelter for 29 residents. The tornado had a peak width of 700–1,760 yards (640–1,610 m).

=== Hardinsburg–Irvington–Brandenburg, Kentucky/Laconia, Indiana ===
Hardinsburg–Irvington–Brandenburg, Kentucky/Laconia, Indiana
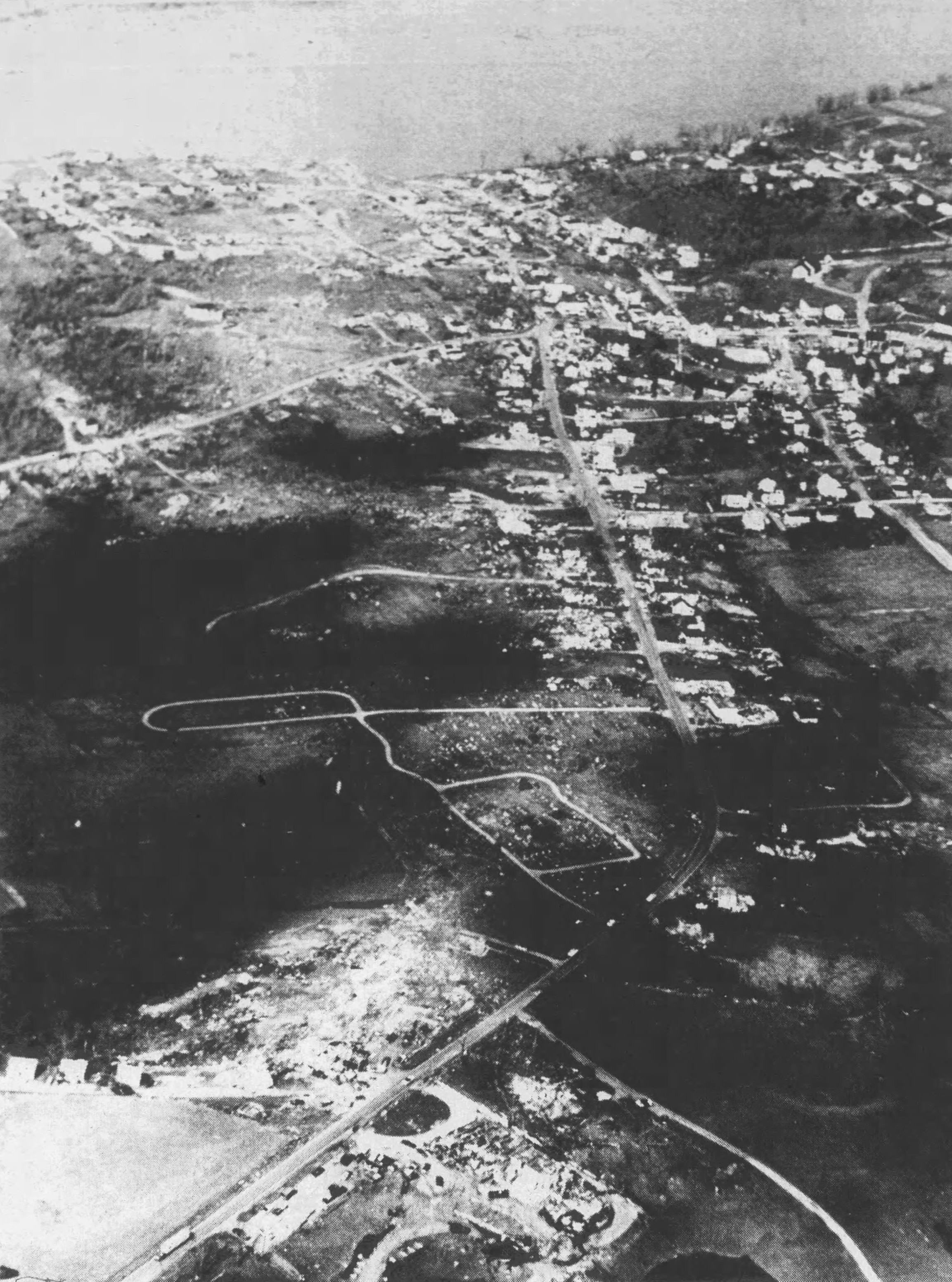
- Aerial photo showing Brandenburg, Kentucky, after the tornado

Meteorological history
- Formed: April 3, 3:30 p.m. CDT (UTC-5:00)
- Dissipated: April 3, 4:22 p.m. CDT (UTC-5:00)
- Duration: 52 minutes

F5 tornado
- on the Fujita scale

Overall effects
- Casualties: 31 fatalities, 257 injuries
- Damage: $2.5 million (1974 USD)

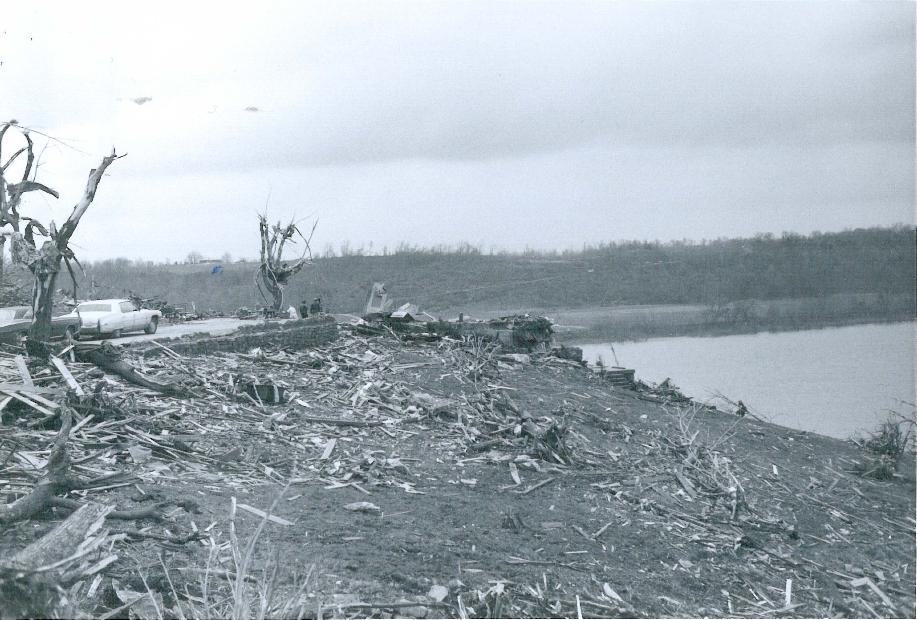
Remains of a house that was completely swept away in Brandenburg, with heavily debarked trees and shrubbery in the foreground.

This deadly and violent tornado, which produced F5 damage and took 31 lives, touched down in Breckinridge County around 3:30 pm CDT and followed a 34-mile (55 km) path. The tornado first moved across the north edge of Hardinsburg, inflicting F3 damage to homes at that location. The tornado quickly became violent as it moved into Meade County, producing F4 damage as it passed north of Irvington, sweeping away numerous homes in this rural area. Vehicles were thrown hundreds of yards from residences and mangled, and a few were completely wrapped around trees. One home that was swept away sustained total collapse of a poured concrete walk-out basement wall. A news photographer reported that the tornado "left no grass" as it crossed KY 79 in this area, and canceled checks from near Irvington were later found in Ohio. Past Irvington, the tornado tore directly through Brandenburg at F5 intensity, completely leveling and sweeping away numerous homes, some of which were well-built and anchor-bolted. The town's downtown area was also devastated with 18 of the fatalities occurring along Green Street alone. Trees and shrubbery in town were debarked and stripped, extensive wind-rowing of debris occurred, and numerous vehicles were destroyed as well, some of which had nothing left but the frame and tires. A curtain rod was found speared deeply into the trunk of one tree in town. Several tombstones in the Cap Anderson cemetery were toppled and broken, and some were displaced a small distance. Exiting Brandenburg, the tornado crossed into Harrison County Indiana, producing F4 damage before dissipating near Laconia. The same storm would later produce tornadoes in the Louisville metro area.

When the tornado struck on April 3, 1974, many of the Brandenburg residents at that time had, in 1937, previously experienced a major flood of the Ohio River that affected the area as well as numerous other communities along the river, including Louisville and Paducah. The Brandenburg tornado is the only tornado to have officially produced documented F5/EF5 damage in the state of Kentucky, with the 1971 Gosser Ridge, Kentucky, tornado being rated F5 by the National Oceanic and Atmospheric Administration and the Nuclear Regulatory Commission, before being downgraded to F4 after 2000.

=== Bellbrook–Xenia–Wilberforce, Ohio ===
Bellbrook–Xenia–Wilberforce, Ohio
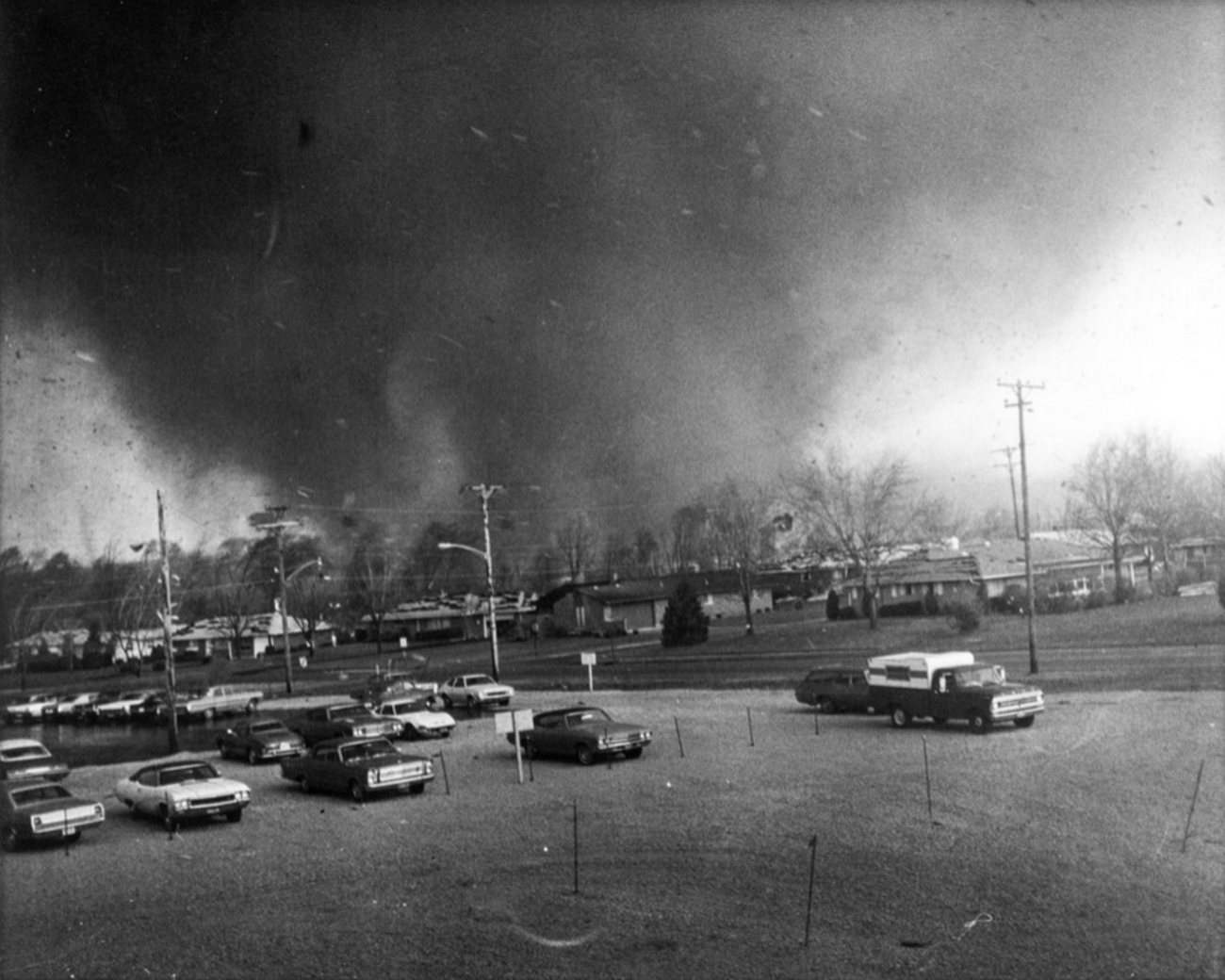
- The Xenia tornado tearing through the southeast Pinecrest Garden district

Meteorological history
- Formed: April 3, 4:33 p.m. EDT (UTC−04:00)
- Dissipated: April 3, 5:12 p.m. EDT (UTC−04:00)
- Duration: 39 minutes

F5 tornado
- on the Fujita scale
- Highest winds: 305 mph (491 km/h)

Overall effects
- Casualties: 34 fatalities, 1,150 injuries
- Damage: $100 million (1974 USD)

The tornado that struck the city of Xenia, Ohio, stands as the deadliest individual tornado of the entire outbreak, killing 32 people and destroying a significant portion of the town. The tornado formed near Bellbrook, Ohio, southwest of Xenia, at about 4:30 pm EDT. It began as a moderate-sized tornado, then intensified while moving northeast at about 50 mph (80 km/h). The tornado exhibited a multiple-vortex structure and became very large as it approached town. The massive tornado slammed into the western part of Xenia, completely flattening the Windsor Park and Arrowhead subdivisions at F5 intensity, and sweeping away entire rows of brick homes with little debris left behind in some areas. Extensive wind-rowing of debris occurred in nearby fields.

When the storm reached central Xenia at 4:40 pm, apartment buildings, homes, businesses, churches, and schools including Xenia High School were destroyed. Students in the school, practicing for a play, took cover in the main hallway seconds before the tornado dropped a school bus onto the stage where they had been practicing and extensively damaged the school building. Several railroad cars were lifted and blown over as the tornado passed over a moving Penn Central freight train in the center of town. It toppled headstones in Cherry Grove Cemetery, then moved through the length of the downtown business district, passing west of the courthouse (which sustained some exterior damage). Numerous businesses in downtown Xenia were heavily damaged or destroyed, and several people were killed at the A&W Root Beer stand as the building was flattened. Upon exiting Xenia, the tornado passed through Wilberforce, heavily damaging several campus and residential buildings of Wilberforce University. Central State University also sustained considerable damage, and a water tower there was toppled. Afterwards, the tornado weakened before dissipating in Clark County near South Vienna, traveling a little over 30 miles (48 km).

A total of 32 people lost their lives in the tornado, and about 1,150 were injured in Xenia, several of whom took proper shelter. In addition to the direct fatalities, two Ohio Air National Guardsmen deployed for disaster assistance were killed on April 17 when a fire swept through his unit's temporary barracks in a furniture store. The memorial in downtown Xenia lists 34 deaths, in honor of the two Guardsmen. About 1,400 buildings (roughly half of the town) were heavily damaged or destroyed. Damage was estimated at US$100 million ($471.7 million in 2013 dollars).

Dr. Ted Fujita and a team of colleagues undertook a 10-month study of the 1974 Super Outbreak. Fujita initially assigned the Xenia tornado a preliminary rating of F6 intensity ± 1 scale, before deeming F6 ratings "inconceivable".

=== Rising Sun, Indiana/Taylorsport, Kentucky/Cincinnati (Sayler Park), Ohio ===
Tri-State (Indiana, Kentucky, Ohio)
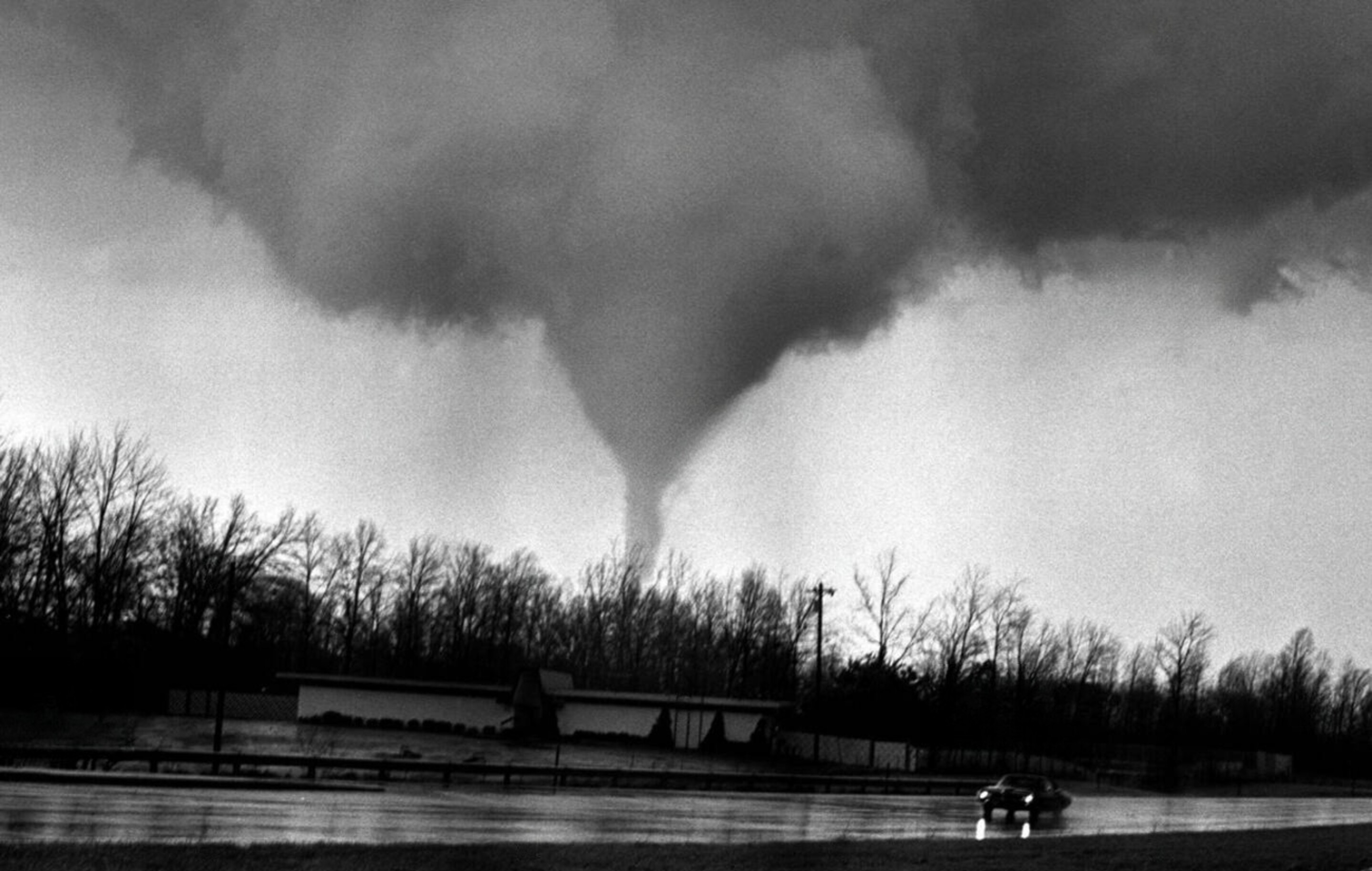
- The tornado as it approached Sayler Park in Cincinnati, Ohio

Meteorological history
- Formed: April 3, 1974, 4:28 p.m. CDT (UTC-5:00)
- Dissipated: April 3, 1974 4:51 p.m. CDT (UTC-5:00)
- Duration: 23 minutes

F5 tornado
- on the Fujita scale
- Highest winds: > 261 mph (420 km/h)

Overall effects
- Casualties: 3 fatalities, 219 injuries

This small and violent tri-state tornado was part of a series of tornadoes that earlier struck portions of southern Indiana from north of Brandenburg, Kentucky, into southwest Ohio. This tornado was witnessed on television by thousands of people, as WCPO aired the tornado live during special news coverage of the tornadoes. It began shortly before 4:30 pm CDT or 5:30 pm EDT in southeastern Indiana in Ohio County north of Rising Sun near the Ohio River. It then traveled through Boone County, Kentucky, producing F4 damage in the Taylorsport area before crossing the Ohio River a second time into Ohio. Here, the tornado reached F5 intensity as it slammed into Sayler Park. At a further inland area of Sayler Park, the tornado maintained F5 intensity as numerous homes were swept away at a hilly area near a lake, with only bare slabs remaining. NWS surveyors noted that a pickup truck in this area was carried a half block over the roofs of five homes before being smashed to the ground. The tornado took three lives and injured 210; 190 of the injuries were in Hamilton County, Ohio alone. It was considered the most-photographed tornado of the outbreak.

This tornado dissipated west of White Oak, but the same thunderstorm activity was responsible for two other tornado touchdowns in the Lebanon and Mason areas. The Mason tornado, which started in the northern Cincinnati subdivisions of Arlington Heights and Elmwood Place, was rated F4 and took two lives, while the Warren County tornado was rated an F2 and injured 10.

=== Louisville–Buckner, Kentucky ===
Louisville–Buckner, Kentucky
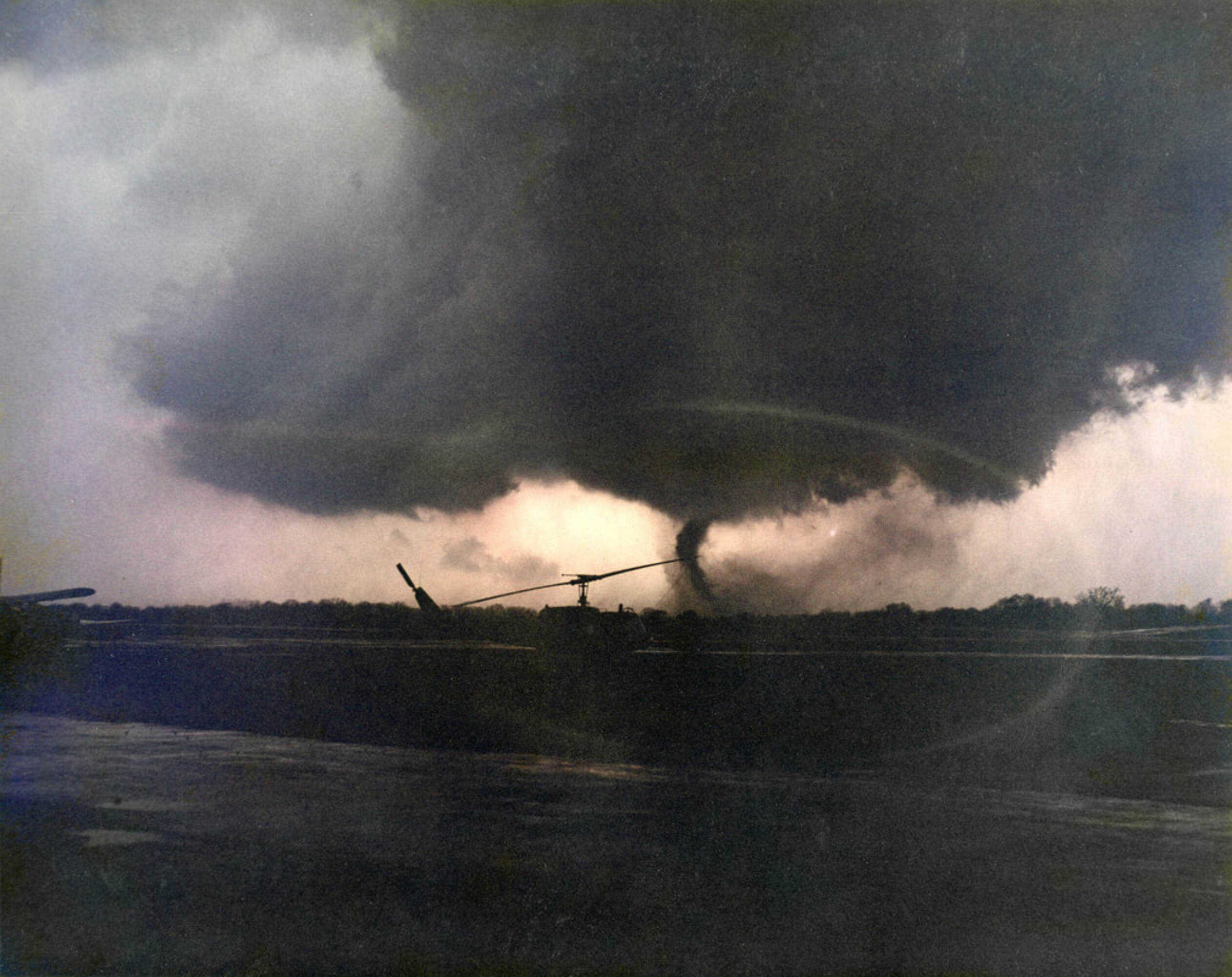
- The Louisville tornado as seen from Bowman Field

Meteorological history
- Formed: April 3, 1974, 4:37 p.m. CDT (UTC-5:00)
- Dissipated: April 3, 1974, 4:59 p.m. CDT (UTC-5:00)
- Duration: 22 minutes

F4 tornado
- on the Fujita scale

Overall effects
- Casualties: 3 fatalities, 207 injuries

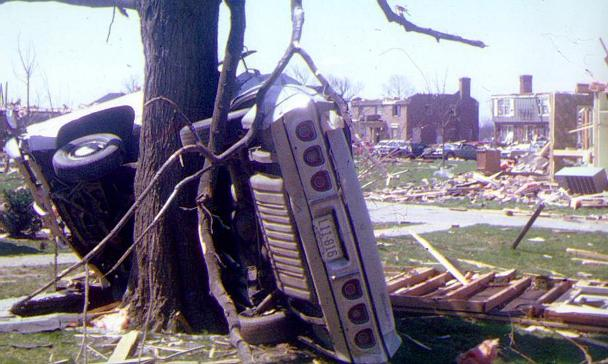
Major damage in the Northfield neighborhood of Louisville, including a vehicle partially wrapped around a tree.

About an hour after the Brandenburg tornado, the same supercell spawned an F4 tornado that formed in the southwest part of Jefferson County near Kosmosdale. Another funnel cloud formed over Standiford Field Airport, touched down at The Kentucky Fair and Exposition Center, and destroyed the majority of the horse barns at the center and part of Freedom Hall (a multipurpose arena) before it crossed I-65, scattering several vehicles on that busy expressway. The tornado continued its 22-mile (35 km) journey northeast where it demolished most of Audubon Elementary School and affected the neighborhoods of Audubon, Cherokee Triangle, Cherokee-Seneca, Crescent Hill, Indian Hills, Northfield, Rolling Fields, and Tyler Park. Numerous homes were destroyed in residential areas, including a few that were leveled. The tornado ended near the junction of Interstates 264 and 71 after killing three people, injuring 207 people, destroying over 900 homes, and damaging thousands of others. Cherokee Park, a historic 409-acre (1.66 km^{2}) municipal park located at Eastern Parkway and Cherokee Road, had thousands of mature trees destroyed. A massive re-planting effort was undertaken by the community in the aftermath of the tornado.

Dick Gilbert, a helicopter traffic reporter for radio station WHAS-AM, followed the tornado through portions of its track including when it heavily damaged the Louisville Water Company's Crescent Hill pumping station, and gave vivid descriptions of the damage as seen from the air. A WHAS-TV cameraman also filmed the tornado when it passed just east of the Central Business District of Louisville.

WHAS-AM broke away from its regular programming shortly before the tornado struck Louisville and was on-air live with John Burke, the chief meteorologist at the National Weather Service's Louisville office at Standiford Field when the tornado first descended. The station remained on the air delivering weather bulletins and storm-related information until well into the early morning hours of April 4. As electrical power had been knocked out to a substantial portion of the city, the radio station became a clearinghouse for vital information and contact with emergency workers, not only in Louisville but across the state of Kentucky due to its 50,000-watt clear-channel signal and the fact that storms had knocked numerous broadcasting stations in smaller communities, such as Frankfort, off the air. Governor Wendell Ford commended the station's personnel for their service to the community in the time of crisis, and Dick Gilbert later received a special commendation from President Richard Nixon for his tracking of the tornado from his helicopter.

=== Monticello–Rochester, Indiana ===
Monticello–Rochester, Indiana
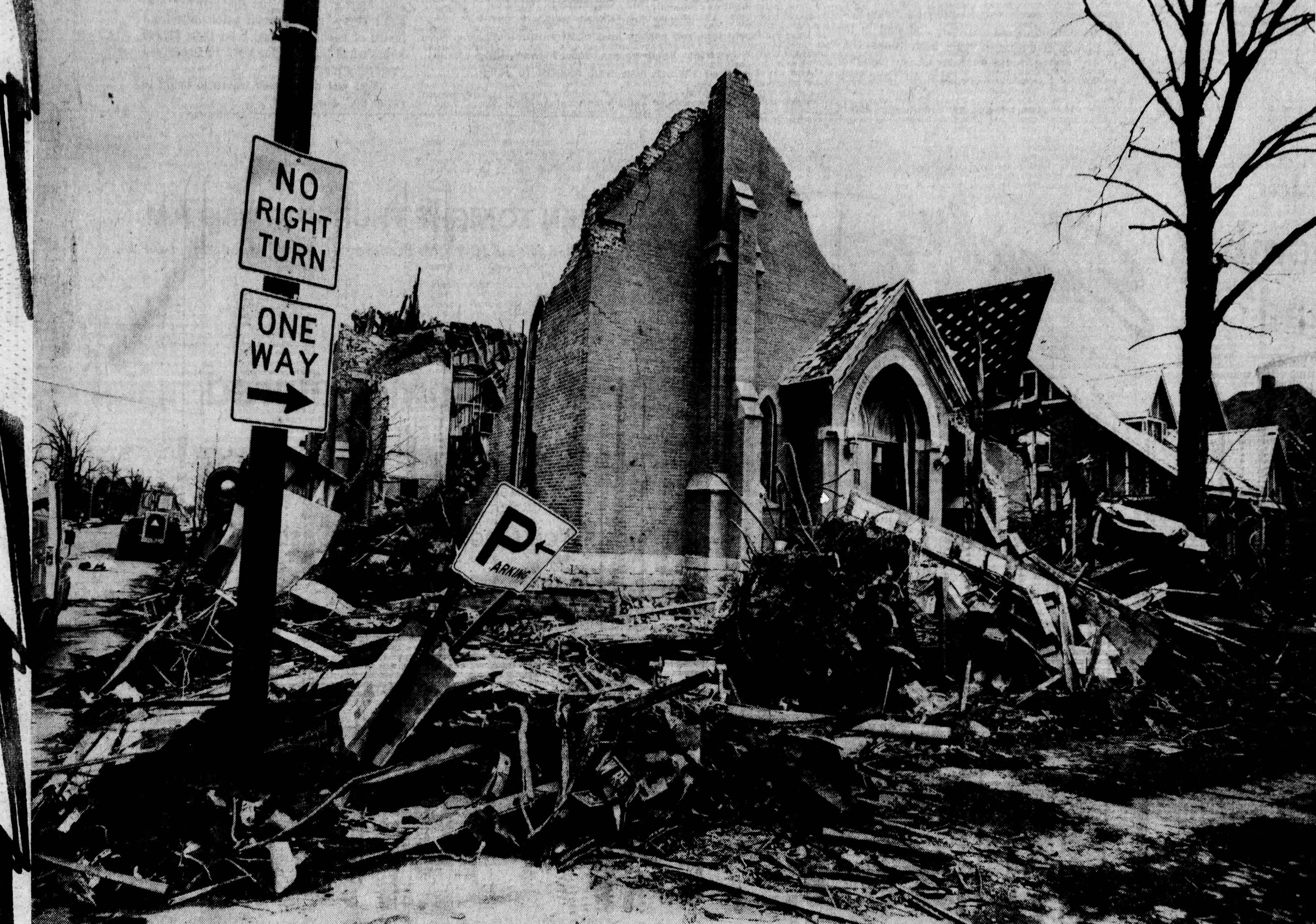
- A church in Monticello after the tornado

Meteorological history
- Formed: April 3, 1974, 4:47 p.m. CDT (UTC−05:00)
- Dissipated: April 3, 1974, 6:47 p.m. CDT (UTC−05:00)
- Duration: 2 hours

F4 tornado
- on the Fujita scale

Overall effects
- Casualties: 18 fatalities, 362 injuries
- Damage: $250 million

This half-mile (0.8 km) wide F4 tornado developed (as part of a tornado family that moved from Illinois to Michigan for 260 miles) during the late afternoon hours. This tornado produced the longest damage path recorded during the outbreak, on a southwest to northeast path that nearly crossed the entire state of Indiana. According to most records (including the presented map of north Indiana), this tornado formed just southwest of Otterbein in northeast Warren County in west central Indiana, and ended in LaGrange County just northwest of Valentine – a total distance of about 121 miles (195 km). Further analysis by Ted Fujita indicated that at the start of the tornado path near Otterbein, downburst winds (also called "twisting downburst") disrupted the tornado's inflow which caused it to briefly dissipate before redeveloping near Brookston in White County at around 4:50 pm EDT and then traveled for 109 miles (175 km). It also struck portions of six other counties, with the hardest hit being White County and its town of Monticello. Much of the town was destroyed including the courthouse, some churches and cemeteries, 40 businesses, and numerous homes, as well as three schools. It also heavily damaged the Penn Central bridge over the Tippecanoe River. Overall damage according to the NOAA was estimated at US$250 million with US$100 million damage in Monticello alone.

After the tornado struck Monticello, the tornado reached peak strength and completely leveled several farms northwest of town. The tornado then went on to tear through the west side of Rochester, where businesses were destroyed and homes were completely leveled and swept away. Riddle Elementary School was badly damaged as well. The tornado then struck Talma, destroying most of the town, including a fastening plant and the schoolhouse. The tornado continued northeast and struck the south sides of Atwood and Leesburg, with additional severe damage occurring at both locations. The tornado then crossed Dewart Lake and Lake Wawasee, destroying multiple lakeside homes and trailers. The Wawasee Airport was hard hit, where hangars were destroyed and planes were thrown and demolished. The tornado destroyed several buildings as it passed between Ligonier and Topeka, including Perry School and a Monsanto plant. Train cars near the plant were blown off the tracks and thrown into the building. The tornado then finally dissipated near Oliver Lake airfield.

A total of 18 people were killed during the storm including five people from Fort Wayne when their mini-bus fell 50 feet (15 m) into the Tippecanoe River near Monticello. One passenger did survive the fall. Five others were killed in White County, six in Fulton County and one in Kosciusko County. The National Guard had assisted the residents in the relief and cleanup efforts and then-Governor Otis Bowen visited the area days after the storm. One of the few consolations from the tornado was that a century-old bronze bell that belonged to the White County Courthouse and served as timekeeper was found intact despite being thrown a great distance. The tornado itself had contradicted a long-time myth that a tornado would "not follow terrain into steep valleys" as while hitting Monticello, it descended a 60-foot (18 m) hill near the Tippecanoe River and heavily damaged several homes immediately afterwards.

=== Moulton–Trinity–Tanner, Alabama ===
Moulton–Trinity–Tanner, Alabama
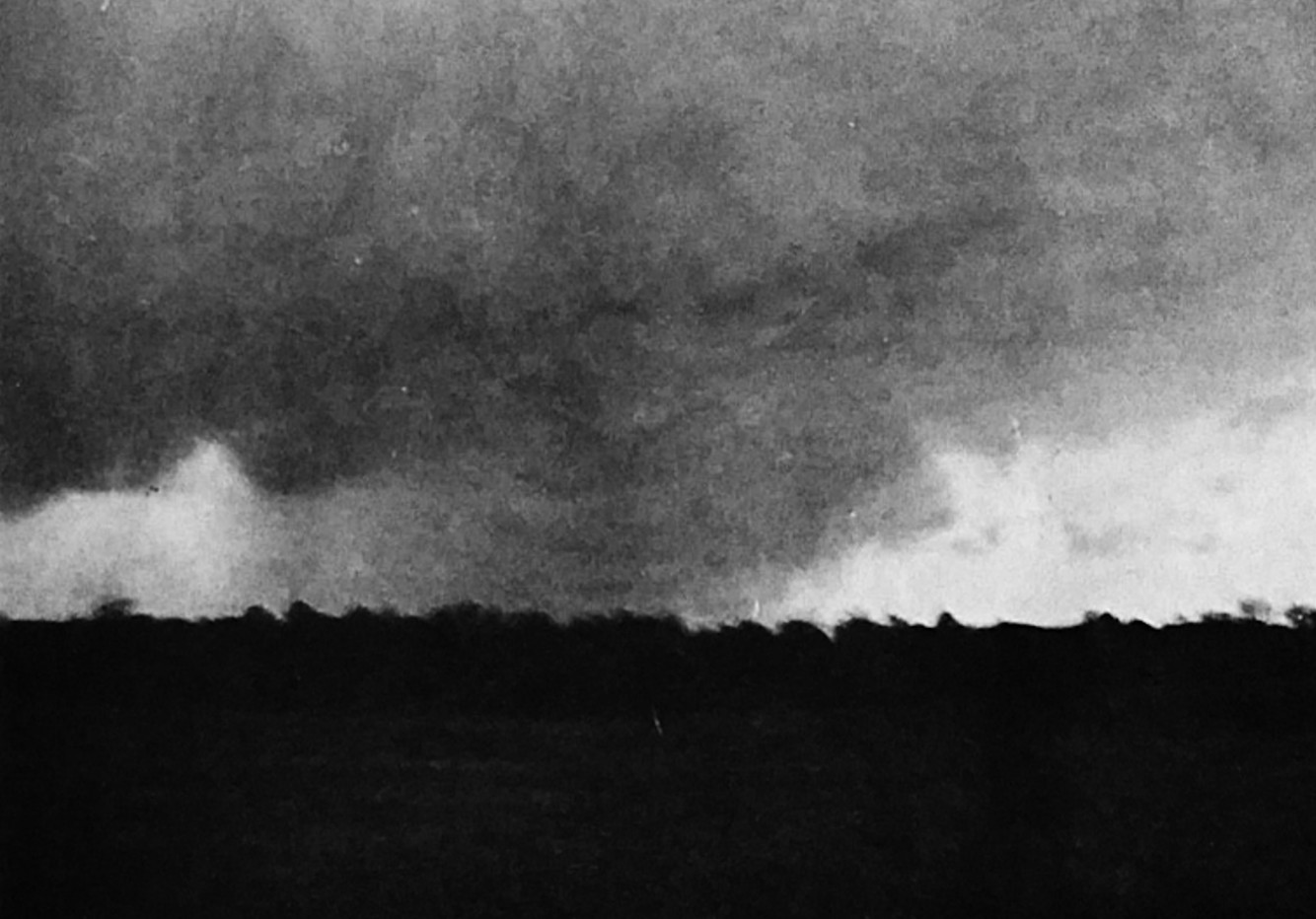
- The tornado seen in Decatur

Meteorological history
- Formed: April 3, 1974, 6:20 p.m. CDT (UTC-5:00)
- Dissipated: April 3, 1974, 7:21 p.m. CDT (UTC-5:00)
- Duration: 61 minutes

F5 tornado
- on the Fujita scale

Overall effects
- Casualties: 28 fatalities, 267 injuries

As the cluster of thunderstorms was crossing much of the Ohio Valley and northern Indiana, additional strong storms developed much further south just east of the Mississippi River into the Tennessee Valley and Mississippi. It produced the first deadly tornadoes in Alabama during the early evening hours. Most of the small town of Tanner, located to the west of Huntsville and south of the Limestone County seat of Athens, was destroyed when two F5 tornadoes struck the community 30 minutes apart.

The first tornado formed at 6:20 pm CDT in Lawrence County, Alabama, and ended 61 minutes later in Madison County, Alabama, killing 28 people. The tornado first touched down near the small community of Mt. Hope, and then tracked into Mt. Moriah, where the tornado rapidly intensified and swept away homes and hurled fleeing vehicles, and where a family of six were killed. Further along the track, many homes were swept away near Moulton. In one case, the destruction was so complete that a witness reported that the largest recognizable objects among scattered debris from an obliterated house were some bed-springs. The tornado crossed into Morgan County, causing additional destruction in rural areas near Hillsboro and Trinity. The tornado then continued into Madison County and struck the Capshaw and Harvest areas. Numerous homes in Harvest and surrounding rural areas of the county were swept completely away and scattered, and extensive wind-rowing of debris was noted. A bathtub from one residence was found deeply embedded into the ground. Past Harvest, the tornado abruptly dissipated northeast of town, having a peak width of 500 yards.

=== Jasper–Cullman–Fairview, Alabama ===
Jasper–Cullman–Fairview, Alabama
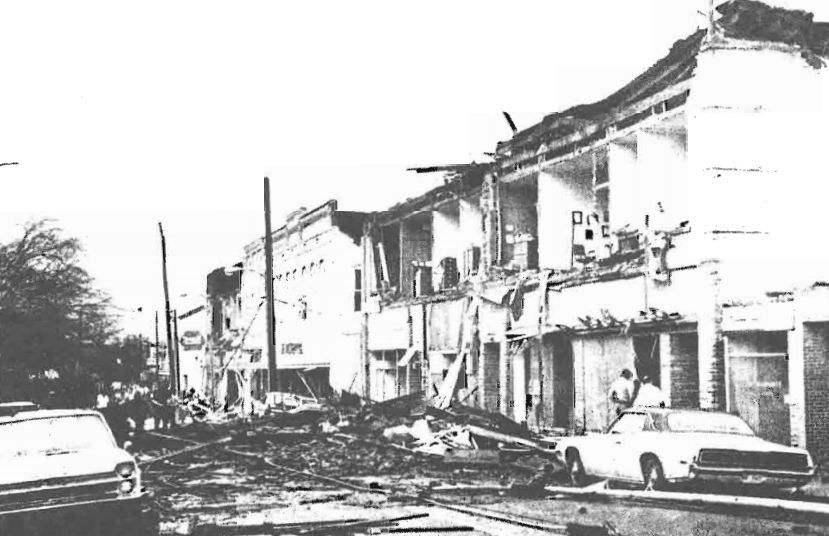
- Heavy damage to buildings in downtown Jasper

Meteorological history
- Formed: April 3, 1974, 6:44 p.m. CDT (UTC-5:00)
- Dissipated: April 3, 1974, 8:48 p.m. CDT (UTC-5:00)
- Duration: 2 hours, 4 minutes

F4 tornado
- on the Fujita scale

Overall effects
- Casualties: 3 fatalities, 178 injuries

While tornadoes were causing devastation in the northwesternmost corner of the state, another supercell crossing the Mississippi-Alabama state line produced another violent tornado that touched down in Pickens County before heading northeast for just over 2 hours towards the Jasper area causing major damage to its downtown as the F4 storm struck. Damage was reported in Cullman from the storm before it lifted.

The Jasper tornado first touched near Aliceville, producing scattered damage as it tracked northeastward. The damage became more intense and continuous as the tornado entered Tuscaloosa County. The tornado continued to strengthen south of Berry, and two people were killed near the Walker County line when a church was destroyed. The tornado tore directly through downtown Jasper at 6:57 PM, resulting in severe damage and at least 100 injuries. Numerous buildings and storefronts were heavily damaged in downtown Jasper, and many streets were blocked with trees and power lines. The Walker County courthouse sustained major damage, and a new fire station was completely leveled. The fireman on duty at the time took shelter in a nearby large culvert, and survived without injury. The Walker County Library and the Jasper First Methodist Church were also damaged. The tornado crossed Lewis Smith Lake and moved across the south side of Cullman at 7:40 pm. Multiple homes and shopping centers were damaged or destroyed in the area, resulting in one death and 36 injuries. The tornado finally dissipated northeast of Cullman a short time later.

In total, the storm took three lives, but injured one hundred and fifty residents of Jasper or Cullman. Five hundred buildings were destroyed, with nearly four hundred other buildings severely damaged. At the same time, a third supercell was crossing the state line near the track of the previous two.

=== Tanner–Harvest–Hazel Green, Alabama/Flintville, Tennessee ===
Tanner–Harvest–Hazel Green, Alabama/Flintville, Tennessee
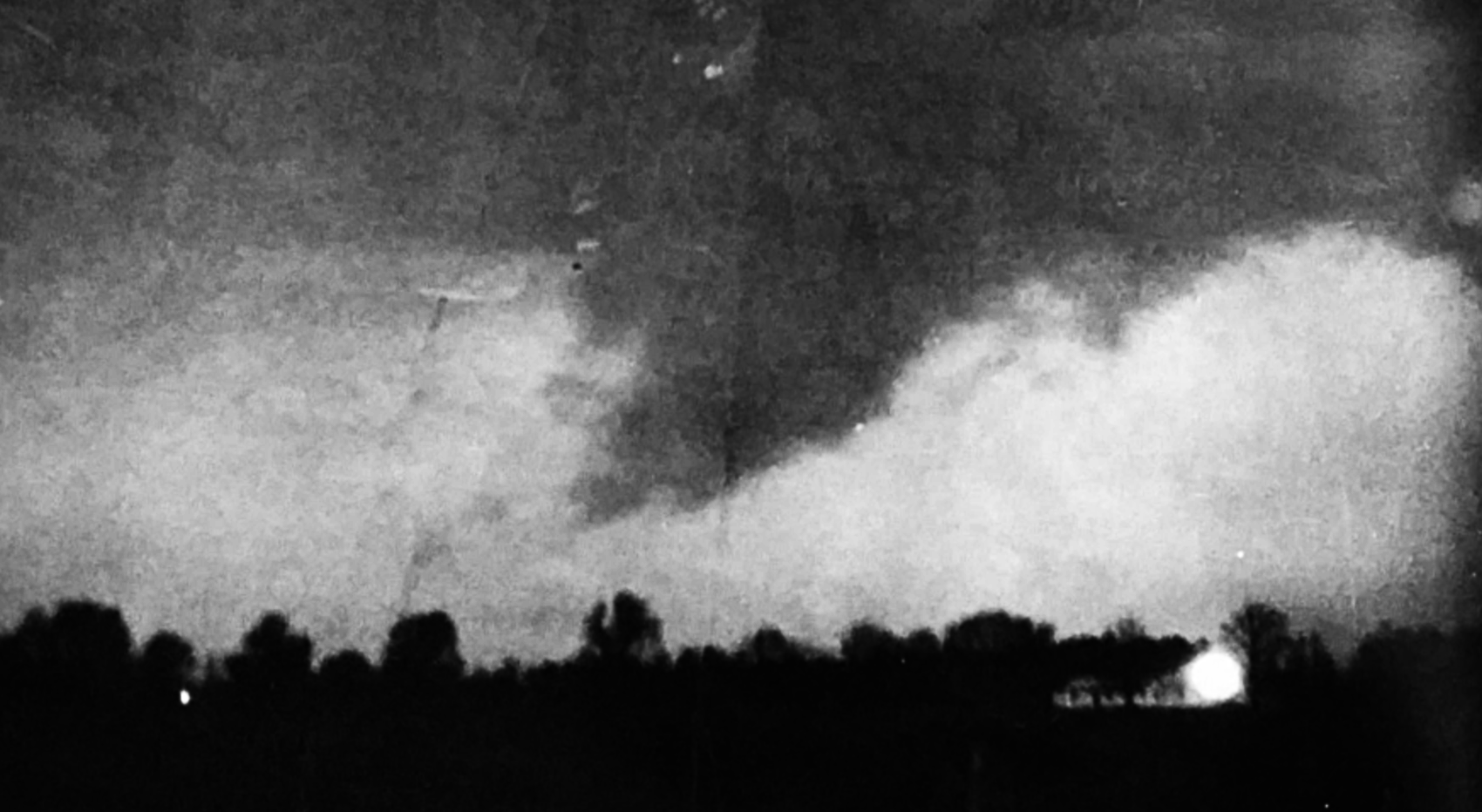
- The tornado as seen near Harvest, Alabama

Meteorological history
- Formed: April 3, 1974 7:30 p.m. CDT (UTC-5:00)
- Dissipated: April 3, 1974, 8:25 p.m. CDT) (UTC-5:00)
- Duration: 55 minutes

F5 tornado
- on the Fujita scale

Overall effects
- Casualties: 22–27 fatalities, 250–270 injuries

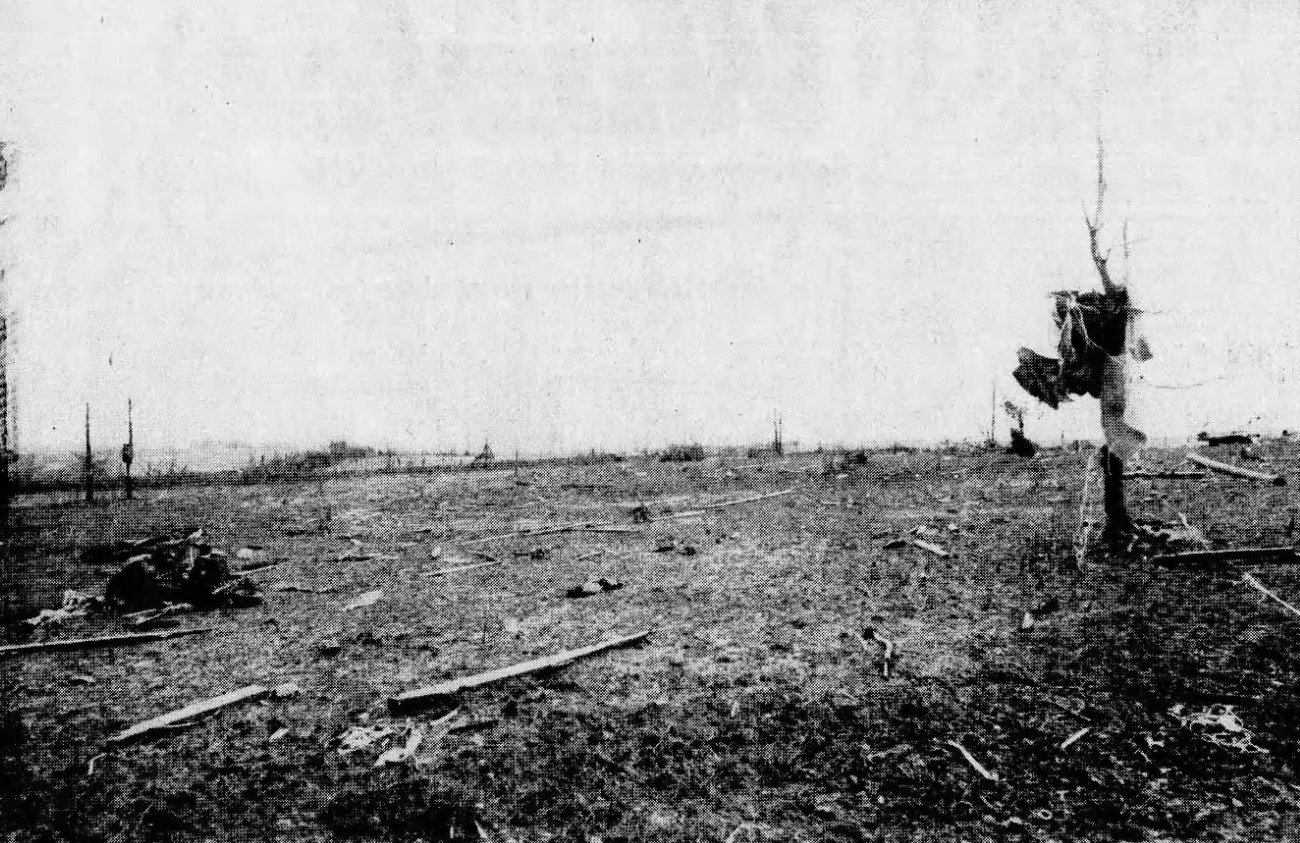
Extreme damage near Harvest, Alabama.

While rescue efforts were underway to look for people under the destroyed structures, few were aware that another violent tornado would strike the area. The path of the second tornado, which formed at 7:30 pm CDT, was at least 50 miles in length and had a peak width of 500 yards. The storm formed along the north bank of the Tennessee River less than a mile from the path of the earlier storm; with much of its path very closely paralleling its predecessor as it tore through Limestone and Madison Counties. 16 people were killed by this second tornado. Tanner was the first community to be hit, and many structures that were left standing after the first tornado were destroyed in the second one. A man injured at Lawson's Trailer Park in the first tornado was taken to an area church, which collapsed in the second tornado, killing him.

After devastating what was left of Tanner, the tornado continued across rural Limestone County and into Madison County, where the communities of Capshaw and Harvest were devastated once again. Numerous homes throughout Madison County were swept completely away, with extensive wind-rowing of debris noted once again. Past Harvest, the tornado swept away multiple additional homes in the Hazel Green area. The tornado continued northeastward through rural portions of Madison County before crossing into Tennessee, where major damage and 6 deaths occurred in Franklin and Lincoln counties before the tornado dissipated in Coffee County. Two of the fatalities in Tennessee occurred when a church was destroyed during service. The death toll from the two tornadoes was over 45 and over 400 were injured. Most of the fatalities occurred in and around the Tanner area. Over 1,000 houses, 200 mobile homes, and numerous other outbuildings, automobiles, power lines, and trees were completely demolished or heavily damaged. The most recent official National Weather Service records show that both of the Tanner tornadoes were rated F5. However, the rating of the second Tanner tornado is still disputed by some scientists; analysis in one publication estimates F3-F4 damage along the entirety of the second storm's path.

=== Caledonia, Mississippi/Guin–Yampertown–Delmar, Alabama ===
Caledonia, Mississippi/Guin–Yampertown–Delmar, Alabama
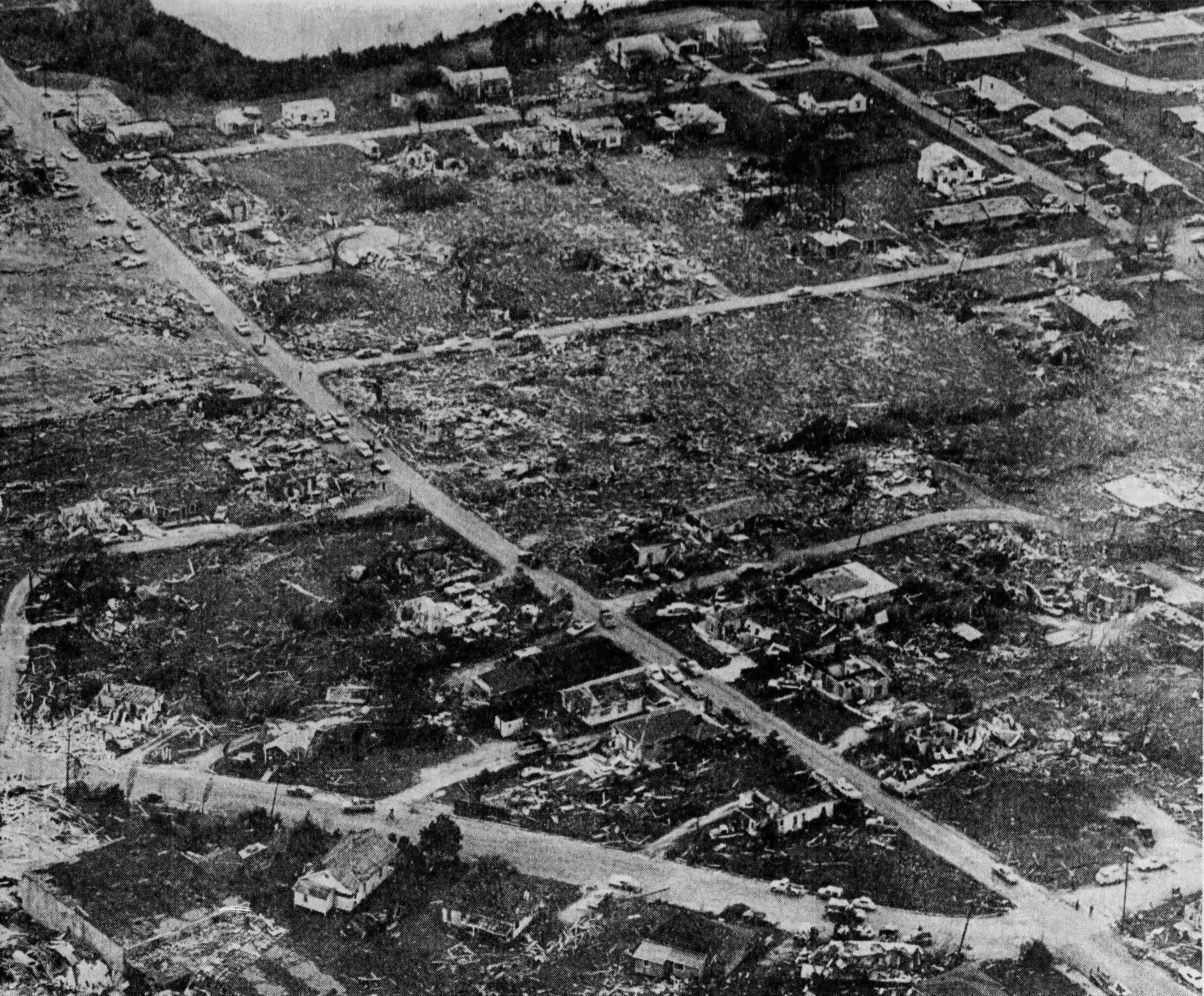
- Damage to the center of Guin, Alabama, after the tornado

Meteorological history
- Formed: April 3, 1974, 8:25 p.m. CDT (UTC-5:00)
- Dissipated: April 3, 1974, 10:30 p.m. CDT (UTC-5:00)
- Duration: 2 hours, 5 minutes

F5 tornado
- on the Fujita scale
- Highest winds: 285 mph (459 km/h)

Overall effects
- Casualties: 28 fatalities, 272 injuries

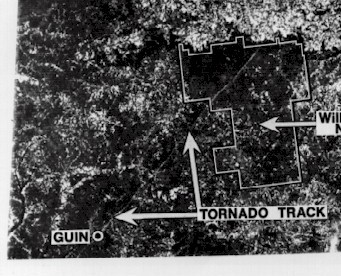
Satellite image showing the scar of the Guin tornado through Guin and the William B. Bankhead National Forest

This fast-moving nighttime tornado, which devastated the town of Guin in Alabama, was the longest lasting F5 tornado recorded in the outbreak, and considered to be one of the most violent ever recorded. The tornado traveled over 135 miles (217 km), from the town of Caledonia, Mississippi, to just south of the small town of Basham, Alabama, before lifting just after 10:55 pm CDT. It formed at around 8:25 pm CDT near the Mississippi-Alabama border, near the town of Caledonia, Mississippi, before quickly moving into Alabama, and striking the Monterey Trailer Park, resulting in major damage at that location. The tornado then became violent as it approached and entered Guin, with multiple areas of F5 damage noted in and around town. The tornado first struck the Guin Mobile Home Plant as it entered the town, completely obliterating the structure. The town's downtown area was also heavily damaged, with many brick businesses and two churches completely destroyed. Trees in town were debarked, ground scouring occurred, and vehicles were thrown and mangled as well. Residential areas in Guin suffered total devastation, with many homes swept completely away and scattered across fields. According to NWS damage surveyor Bill Herman, the damage in one 6-block area was particularly extreme, and remarked that "It was just like the ground had been swept clean. It was just as much of a total wipeout as you can have." Surveyor J. B. Elliot noted that the destruction was so complete, that even some of the foundations were "dislodged, and in some cases swept away". A total of 23 people were killed in Guin.

The tornado continued past Guin and struck the small community of Yampertown (now known as Twin), destroying numerous homes, mobile homes, and businesses at that location, though the damage was less intense than that observed in Guin. Crossing into Winston County, the tornado struck the small community of Delmar, destroying additional homes and killing 5 people. Mobile homes in Delmar were obliterated, with their frames wrapped around trees. Past Delmar, the tornado grew up to a mile wide as it tore through the William B. Bankhead National Forest, flattening a huge swath of trees. Surveyors noted that timber damage was equally severe at all elevations in this area, with numerous trees snapped both along exposed ridges and in deep gorges. So many trees were snapped in this area that the tornado path was visible from satellite. The tornado finally dissipated south of Basham after destroying 546 structures.

=== Redstone Arsenal–Huntsville, Alabama ===
Redstone Arsenal–Huntsville, Alabama
- The tornado being illuminated by power flashes as it tracked through Huntsville

Meteorological history
- Formed: April 3, 1974, 10:24 p.m. CDT (UTC-5:00)
- Dissipated: April 3, 1974, 11:15 p.m. CDT (UTC-5:00)
- Duration: 51 minutes

F3 tornado
- on the Fujita scale

Overall effects
- Casualties: 2 fatalities, 7 injuries

Huntsville was affected shortly before 11:00 pm EDT by a strong F3 tornado produced by the same thunderstorm that produced the Guin tornado. This tornado produced heavy damage in the south end of the city, eventually damaging or destroying nearly 1,000 structures.

The tornado touched down north of Hartselle and moved northeast toward Huntsville. It first hit the Redstone Arsenal, damaging or destroying numerous buildings at that location. But thanks to early warning from an MP picket line on Rideout Road (now Research Park Boulevard (SR 255)), there were only seven, relatively minor, injuries. One of the buildings destroyed was a publications center for the Nuclear Weapons Training School on the Arsenal. For months afterwards, portions of classified documents were being returned by farmers in Tennessee and Alabama. Many homes were badly damaged or destroyed as the tornado passed through residential areas of the city, and a school was destroyed as well. Many businesses were also heavily damaged, and numerous trees and power lines were downed throughout the city. The Glenn'll trailer park was completely destroyed by the tornado, and some sources list a fatality occurring at that location. The tornado then reached Monte Sano Mountain, which has an elevation of 1,640 feet (500 m), where additional homes were torn apart. The National Weather Service office at Huntsville Jetplex was briefly "closed and abandoned" due to the severe weather conditions. The tornado eventually dissipated near Jacobs Mountain. Remarkable electrical phenomenon was reported as the tornado passed through Huntsville, with reports of luminous clouds, ball lightning, and multi-colored flashes and glowing areas in the sky as the storm moved through the city. These aforementioned flashes were more than likely power flashes, which are flashes of light caused by arcing electrical discharges from damaged electrical equipment, most often severed power lines.

== Non-tornadic effects ==
Non-tornadic deaths by state
State/Province	Fatalities
Michigan	2
Nebraska	5
Ohio	1
Oklahoma	1
Virginia	1

=== Blizzard ===
Colorado, Nebraska, Kansas, and Michigan

On April 2–3, a blizzard on the backside of the storm impacted much of eastern Colorado. Schools and highways were closed and utilities were damaged. Precipitation started off as rain in the afternoon and transitioned to heavy, wet snow by the evening. Greeley saw 1.45 in (3.7 cm) of rain and 6.5 in (17 cm) of snow. Kersey observed 2.3 in (5.8 cm) of rain. Rural areas saw up to 12 in (30 cm) of snow. Eleven accidents occurred because of the rain. Blizzard conditions spread into Nebraska where accumulations up to 12 in (30 cm) were piled into snow drifts 7 ft (2.1 m) high by 60 mph (97 km/h) winds. Snowfall reached 10 to 12 in (25 to 30 cm) in southwestern Scotts Bluff County. Schools across the entire state and many highways were closed. Power outages were widespread and numerous highway accidents led to five fatalities. Near-blizzard impacted portions of northwestern Kansas, rendering travel extremely hazardous. Strong winds caused a wall of an under-construction building in Haysville to collapse.

In the Upper Peninsula, 4 to 12 in (10 to 30 cm) of snow fell west of Negaunee and Crystal Falls. One person died from a heart attack while shoveling snow. Freezing rain east of these areas to Munising and Spalding caused numerous traffic accidents. An ice jam along the north shore of Crystal Lake in Benzie County damaged several homes.

=== Straight-line winds and flash flooding ===
Oklahoma

Severe thunderstorms on April 2 brought winds up to 85 mph (137 km/h). One person was killed in Durant when his mobile home was rolled. A 318,000 volt power line near Weatherford was damaged, cutting power to the town.

Illinois

In Sangamon County, Illinois, winds up to 54 mph (87 km/h) were measured at Abraham Lincoln Capital Airport and there were unverified reports of 2.5 in (6.4 cm) diameter hail. Minor wind damage was reported in Fayette County.

Georgia

Severe thunderstorms on April 4 brought 1 to 3 in (2.5 to 7.6 cm) of rain to tornado-stricken areas of northwest Georgia. Flash floods were considered a major risk in the region's mountainous terrain. Forty people were evacuated from Cedartown when the Big Cedar Creek overflowed and inundated 100 homes.

Ohio

One person was killed near Cincinnati from a downburst as the F5 Sayler Park tornado moved nearby.

Michigan

One home was destroyed in Monroe. Flash floods from heavy rain washed out many roads in Sanilac and St. Clair counties. About 3 in (7.6 cm) of rain fell in 2 hours, overwhelming the flood capacity of many culverts; at least 76 culverts and small bridges, some 50 years old, were damaged or destroyed in Sanilac County at a cost of $15,000–20,000. A sinkhole occurred along M-46. A train was derailed when a bridge was washed away. A mobile home was knocked from its foundation in Port Huron where winds reached 46 mph (74 km/h). Freeway underpasses were flooded in Metro Detroit.

Mississippi

Hailstones of 2 to 3 in (5.1 to 7.6 cm) in diameter fell in Columbus, Mississippi. North of Columbus, one home had its roof torn off by strong winds. Near Clayton in Winston County, severe wind damage occurred throughout a 2 mi (3.2 km) swath. Several farm buildings and homes were damaged and one trailer was destroyed. Many power lines were snapped.

West Virginia

In Alderson, West Virginia, "tornado-like winds" caused extensive damage to homes and businesses primarily along WV 3, some of which had their roof torn off. Winds were measured up to 62 mph (100 km/h) in Charleston. Many trees and power lines were downed leaving more than 7,000 people without electricity.

Virginia

Widespread wind damage occurred in many counties across western Virginia as a squall line moved through in the morning hours of April 4. Five people were injured near Blacksburg in Montgomery County when three mobile homes were rolled up to 50 ft (15 m) and destroyed by high winds. A tractor-trailer was blown off I-81 at Weyers Cave. Lightning struck a radio tower in Radford, temporarily knocking WRAD-FM offline. One person was killed and another was injured near Hayter in Washington County when their mobile home was destroyed. Approximately 5,000 Appalachian Power customers lost electricity. In Bath County, the winds downed hundreds of trees, snapped power poles, and tore the roof off of a church. A woman and her three children were evacuated from their home as the Laurel Creek topped its banks. Minor flooding occurred in Grayson County.

As thunderstorms moved across southern New York in the morning hours of April 4, lightning across Long Island, New York City, and Westchester County caused power outages. One bolt set a barn ablaze and damaged four homes.

Canada

The Trout River overtopped its banks along Quebec Route 138 between the Trout River Border Crossing at the US-Canada border to Huntingdon.

== Aftermath ==
=== Immediate relief ===
On April 5, Georgia Governor Jimmy Carter declared 13 counties as disaster areas and put in a request to President Nixon for federal aid, citing damage in excess of $15.5 million. Service centers were opened at two National Guard Armories, one in Dalton and the other in Calhoun, as well as a church in Dawsonville. The National Guard provided four-wheel drive vehicles for search and rescue efforts.

West Virginia Governor Moore declared 14 counties as disaster areas by April 5 and requested the assistance of the National Guard. President Nixon approved federal aid for Fayette, Greenbriar, Raleigh, and Wyoming Counties on April 11. Total damage from the tornadoes and thunderstorms in the state reached $3,655,000, more than half of which was incurred by Raleigh County. The West Virginia State Department of Highways provided two water trucks. The local Red Cross provided $3,000 to victims in Fayette County and assisted residents with acquiring supplies and dealing with medical bills. Sightseers traveling to look at the damage clogged up roadways. The Federal Disaster Assistance Administration (later FEMA) indicated that trailers refurbished after the 1972 Buffalo Creek flood would be used to house displaced persons.

=== Congressional response ===
On April 10, voting on the Disaster Relief Act of 1974 was expedited and passed unanimously in the United States Senate in direct response to the scale of damage from the tornado outbreak. The primary purpose of the act was to overhaul how disasters are handled on a federal level and to make acquiring federal aid easier. Notably, it would prompt the creation of a disaster-coordinating agency. President Nixon signed it into federal law on May 22.

== See also ==
- List of tornadoes and tornado outbreaks
  - List of North American tornadoes and tornado outbreaks
  - Lists of Canadian tornadoes and tornado outbreaks
- List of tornadoes striking downtown areas of large cities
- List of F5 and EF5 tornadoes
- Tornado outbreak of December 10–11, 2021 – One of the deadliest tornado outbreaks in Kentucky's history.
- 2011 Super Outbreak – A very similar, but larger and deadlier outbreak that occurred in April 2011.
- Tornado outbreak and derecho of April 1–3, 2024 – A tornado outbreak that affected similar areas almost exactly 50 years later.

== Sources ==
- Fujita, T. Theodore; Abbey, Robert F. Jr. (1983) [1981]. "Chapter 3: Tornadoes: The Tornado Outbreak of 3–4 April 1974". In Kessler, Edwin (ed.). The Thunderstorm in Human Affairs (2nd ed.). Norman, Oklahoma: University of Oklahoma Press. pp. 37–66.
- Grazulis, Thomas P. (July 1990). Significant Tornadoes, 1880-1989. St. Johnsbury, VT: The Tornado Project of Environmental Films. ISBN 9781879362024 – via Internet Archive.
- Agee, E.M.; Snow, J.T.; Clare, P.R. (May 1, 1976). "Multiple Vortex Features in the Tornado Cyclone and the Occurrence of Tornado Families". Monthly Weather Review. 104 (5). American Meteorological Society: 552–563. Bibcode:1976MWRv..104..552A. doi:10.1175/1520-0493(1976)104<0552:MVFITT>2.0.CO;2.
