= 1974 Guin tornado =

F5 tornado in Alabama, United States

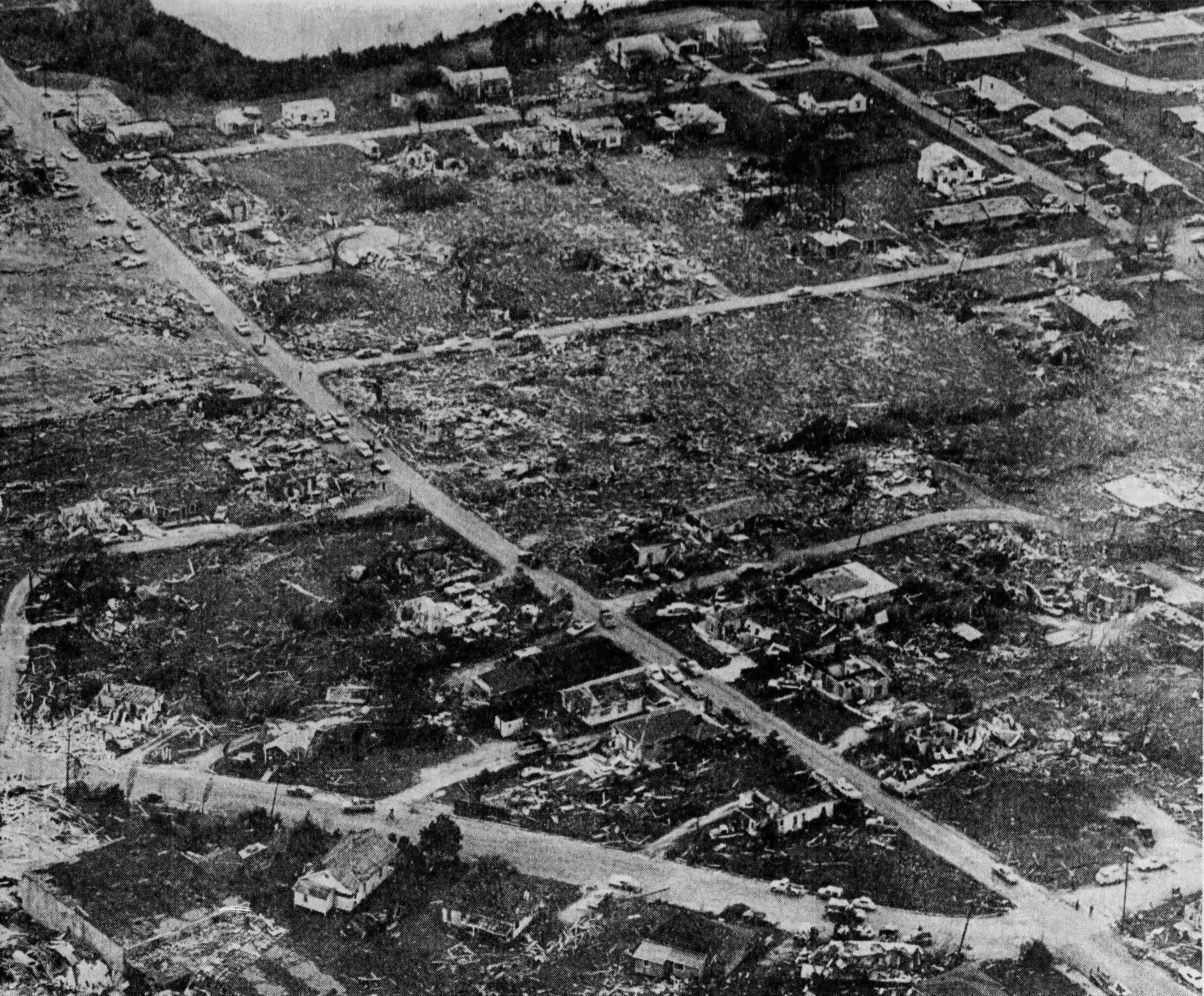
- An aerial shot of tornado damage in the heart of Guin. Twenty-three would be killed in the town.

Meteorological history
- Formed: April 3, 1974, 8:25 p.m. CDT (UTC-5:00)
- Dissipated: April 3, 1974, 10:30 p.m. CDT (UTC-5:00)
- Duration: 2 hours, 5 minutes

F5 tornado
- on the Fujita scale
- Path length: 101 mi (163 km)
- Highest winds: >285 mph (459 km/h)

Overall effects
- Fatalities: 28
- Injuries: 272
- Damage: $45 million (1974 USD)
- Areas affected: Lowndes County in Mississippi, and Lamar County, Marion County, Winston County, Lawrence County and Morgan County, in Alabama
- Houses destroyed: 737 (including 191 mobile homes)
- Part of the 1974 Super Outbreak and Tornadoes of 1974

The 1974 Guin tornado was a powerful and fast-moving tornado that moved across northern portions of Alabama, hitting several towns along a 135 mi (217 km) path and devastating the town of Guin during the evening hours of April 3, 1974. The tornado would receive a rating of F5 on the Fujita scale, and was one of seven tornadoes to obtain the rating as part of the 1974 Super Outbreak.

The tornado first touched down in eastern Mississippi near the town of Caledonia, before crossing state lines into Alabama. It would move to the northeast, rapidly intensifying as it neared the town of Guin. The tornado obliterated numerous brick buildings in Guin, claiming the lives of twenty-three residents before exiting the town, which lay in ruins. The tornado would produce extreme damage as it moved over forests and other rural areas; this damage was visible from satellite imagery that was conducted after the outbreak. The tornado dissipated over an hour and a half after touching down, having reached a maximum width of 1,350 yards (1,230 m).

The tornado was so powerful that Ted Fujita considered assigning the tornado an F6 rating; the tornado was eventually rated by Fujita as "F5+".

== Meteorological synopsis ==
Earlier on April 3rd, three bands of convection would develop, the third developing at about 16:00 UTC, extending from near St. Louis into west-central Illinois. Based upon real-time satellite imagery and model data, differential positive vorticity advection coincided with the left exit region of an upper-level jet streak, which reached wind speeds of up to 130 kn (150 mph) (66.9 m/s (241 km/h)), thereby enhancing thunderstorm growth. Storms grew rapidly in height and extent, producing baseball-sized hail by 17:20 UTC in Illinois and, shortly thereafter, in St. Louis, Missouri, which reported a very severe thunderstorm early in the afternoon that, while not producing a tornado, was the costliest storm to hit the city up to that time. By 19:50 UTC, supercells producing F3 tornadoes hit the Decatur and Normal areas in Illinois. As thunderstorms moved into the warmer, moister air mass over eastern Illinois and Indiana, they produced longer-lived tornadoes—one of which began near Otterbein and ended near Valentine in Indiana, a distance of 121 miles (195 km).

Meanwhile, by 00:00 UTC the southern half of the first convective band became indistinguishable from new convection that had formed farther south over Alabama and Tennessee in connection with convective band two. In this area, increasing west-southwesterly wind shear at all levels of the troposphere, juxtaposed over near-parallel outflow boundaries, allowed successive supercells, all producing strong, long-tracked tornadoes, to develop unconstrained by their outflow in a broad region from eastern Mississippi to southern Tennessee. These storms, forming after 23:00 UTC, produced some of the most powerful tornadoes of the outbreak, including a large and long-tracked F4 that struck the western and central portions of Alabama, tracking for just over 110 miles (180 km), two F5s that both slammed into Tanner, causing extensive fatalities. One supercell in Mississippi from this group of storms would produce the Guin F5 at about 8:25 p.m.

== Tornado summary ==
The tornado would first touch down in Mississippi north of Columbus, first impacting Alabama 6 mi (9.7 km) north of Vernon. As the tornado entered Marion County, it became "probably the most powerful tornado ever observed in Alabama" as it approached Guin.

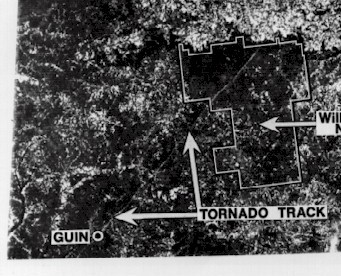
The path of the tornado, as seen via satellite imagery.

The town's downtown area would then be heavily damaged, with many brick businesses and two churches completely destroyed. Trees in town were debarked, ground scouring occurred, and vehicles were thrown and mangled as well. Residential areas in Guin suffered total devastation, with many homes swept completely away and scattered across fields. According to NWS damage surveyor Bill Herman, the damage in one 6-block area was particularly extreme, and remarked that "It was just like the ground had been swept clean. It was just as much of a total wipeout as you can have." Both the City Hall and the Guin Mobile Home Plant were destroyed. A total of 23 people were killed in the town, which was left in ruins. A further 250 were injured.

The tornado struck and heavily damaged Delmar in Winston County, where five lives were killed. It would weaken and dissipate near the Tennessee River, with the storm cycling to produce an additional deadly tornado that would tear through the southern Huntsville metro area and the Redstone Arsenal, killing two people.

== See also ==
- 1974 Xenia tornado, another F5 tornado that would hit Ohio on the same day
- 2011 Hackleburg–Phil Campbell tornado, another EF5 tornado that would hit similar areas over 30 years later
- Tornado records
