= Shortwave (meteorology) =

Embedded kink in the trough / ridge pattern

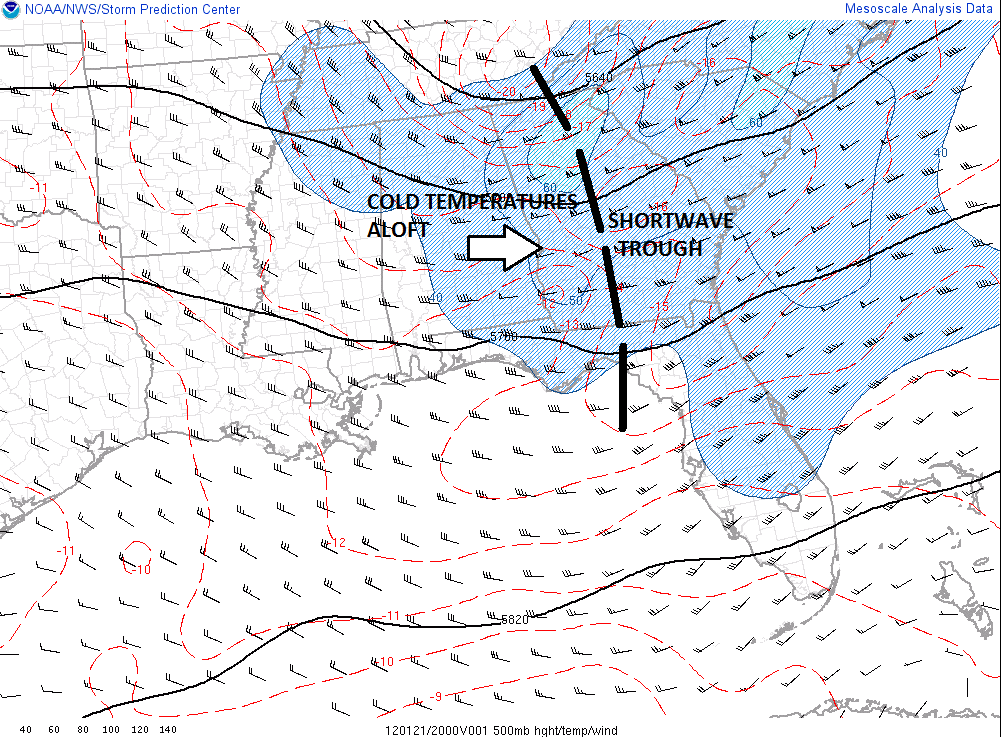
Shortwave trough with associated vorticity.

A shortwave or shortwave trough is an embedded kink in the trough / ridge pattern. Its length scale is much smaller than that of and is embedded within longwaves, which are responsible for the largest scale (synoptic scale) weather systems. Shortwaves may be contained within or found ahead of longwaves and range from the mesoscale to the synoptic scale. Shortwaves are most frequently caused by either a cold pool or an upper level front. Shortwaves are commonly referred to as a vorticity maximum.

== Corresponding weather and effects ==
Shortwaves are often associated with warm air advection (WAA) or cold air advection (CAA), which influence temperature. Due to the way they move the air around them and the way air moves away from them, shortwaves produce positive curvature vorticity and positive shear vorticity, respectively. Ahead of a shortwave there is large-scale lift due to divergence from positive vorticity advection (PVA). This lift often causes precipitation. In a capped environment, the lift generated by a shortwave may cool the inversion layer as a result of the rapid expansion of the air (adiabatic cooling), allowing for deep, moist convection.

=== Convective development ===
Shortwave troughs are a cause of lift, or forcing, which is required for the development of thunderstorms and convection. Convection is very prevalent around shortwave troughs because not only do they provide forcing, but they are also associated with systems that provide other ingredients for the formation of thunderstorms, such as instability, wind shear, and helicity. Shortwave troughs also cause severe weather because the ingredients are usually enhanced by shortwaves because these are stronger than the mean environment and weather systems around them.
