= Delmar, Alabama =

Unincorporated community in Alabama, United States

Delmar
- Community
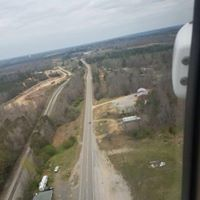
- Aerial of Delmar on Highway 13 South

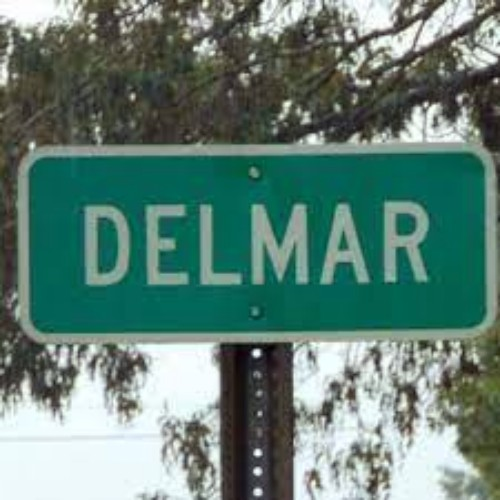

- Location within the state of Alabama
- Coordinates: 34°10′12″N 87°36′20″W
- Country: United States
- State: Alabama
- County: Winston
- Time zone: UTC-6 (Central (CST))
  - Summer (DST): UTC-5 (CDT)
- ZIP codes: 35551
- Area code: 205

Delmar is a small, rural, community in west-central Winston County, United States. Delmar is located six miles north of Natural Bridge, five miles south of Haleyville and 15 miles west of Double Springs, the county seat of what was once the "Free State of Winston." Delmar has an elevation of 881 feet above sea level.

== Origins of the name "Delmar" ==
Delmar was originally called "Frog Level." Presumably, the community was called Frog Level because of the swampy land that existed around the area at the time. In the 19th century, the citizens of Frog Level asked the U. S. Postal Service to open a post office in their community, since the nearest post office was in Ark (where Needmore, Alabama is currently located). Their request was denied because there was another Frog Level, Alabama (now Fayette, Alabama) and it already had a post office. In order to get a post office, the citizens of the Frog Level in Winston County had to change their town's name. Around 1887, the town began to be known as "Delmar."

The exact origins of the name "Delmar" are unknown. A popular belief holds that a construction engineer with the railroad had a retired race horse by the name of "Delmar" or "Del Mar" (Spanish for "from the sea"). The horse was well known and loved by the community. When work on the railroad was completed around 1887, the community was renamed after the race horse.

After notifying the U. S. Postal Service of its name change, Delmar's first post office was opened on September 1, 1887. Newton L. Powell was the first Postmaster of Delmar. The current post office building was erected in 1971, during the service of Postmaster Mrs. Martha Roberts Stewart.

Today, the name of the town of Delmar is pronounced "Delmer."

== 19th-century history ==
According to legend, Delmar was not always the sleepy little community it is today. During the coal mining boom of the 19th century, there were several saloons in Delmar. Reportedly, Delmar was as lively as a town out of the Wild West, complete with drunken bar room brawls.

Byler Road was completed through Winston County in 1820. The historic highway, which ran through parts of what are today Delmar, Natural Bridge, Lynn, and Haleyville, connected the towns of northern Alabama with Tuscaloosa, which at the time was the capital of Alabama.

When Alabama seceded from the Union in 1861, the people of Winston County did not want to fight their Northern or Southern brothers and wanted to remain neutral in the Civil War. They decided that if a state could secede from the nation, then a county could secede from a state, and formed "Free State of Winston." The people of neighboring counties called the people of Winston County Tories (Northern sympathizers).

During the closing phases of the Civil War, Union troops made their way through Winston County on parts of what today are Winston County Road 17. Union troops set up their camps on the side of the road. Today, the road is better known as "Yankee Trace Road."

After the Civil War, a rail line was built from Sheffield, Alabama, to Delmar by the Northern Alabama Railroad. After several years, a rail line was built from Parrish, Alabama, to Delmar. This allowed rail service from Birmingham to the Shoals area. Today, Norfolk Southern Railway still runs cargo trains through Delmar.

== 20th century and recent history ==
In the late 1960s, Marshall Durbin built its regional headquarters in Delmar.

On the night of April 3, 1974, Delmar was struck by a deadly tornado, as were communities in 12 other states and Canada during the 1974 Super Outbreak. Five people died in Delmar as a result of the tornado. Several homes and other structures were destroyed. Many homes that suffered little or no direct damage were without electricity, telephone, and water service for several days.

In January 1993, the people of Delmar decided to establish a volunteer fire department for their community. Currently, the department has 30 firefighters, two pumpers and two tankers and a brush truck. The current Fire Chief is Ray Cantrell.

In 1998, MSR Forest Products built a large plant in Delmar. Today, it employs over 100 people.

On January 27, 2000, Delmar received its first visit from a U.S. Senator when Richard Shelby visited the small Winston County town.

Like so many small towns and communities in Alabama, Delmar has experienced times of economic boom and bust over the past 100 years. Today, Delmar is experiencing somewhat of an economic upturn with several businesses opening in and around Delmar. Tony BrakeField serves as the current mayor of Delmar.

== Notable people ==
Perhaps the most famous person from Delmar is Federal Judge Frank Johnson, Jr. Although Johnson was born in Delmar in 1918, he was reared and attended school in nearby Haleyville. He served in World War II, after which he began a law career. In 1955, President Dwight D. Eisenhower appointed him to a federal judgeship in Alabama. Almost immediately, Johnson was hearing important cases of the civil rights era. In a ruling involving the Montgomery bus boycott, he ruled that racial segregation of public transportation was illegal. Johnson often locked horns with Alabama Governor George Wallace over racial issues. In 1965, Johnson ordered Wallace to allow civil rights protesters to march from Selma to Montgomery. He was often targeted because of his rulings. In 1967, his mother's house was bombed. In July, 1999, at the age of 80, Johnson died at his Montgomery residence. He was buried in the Winston Memorial Cemetery near Haleyville.

== Churches ==
There are five churches in the Delmar area: Delmar Baptist Church, Union Grove Baptist Church, Mount Zion Baptist Church, Bethel #2 Baptist Church, and Botush Freewill Baptist Church.
