= Audubon, Louisville =

Neighborhood of Louisville, Kentucky, US

Coordinates: 38°12′15″N 85°43′31″W

Audubon is a neighborhood in Louisville, Kentucky, United States. Its boundaries are Clarks Lane to the north, Poplar Level Road to the east, Preston Highway to the west, and the city of Audubon Park to the south. The smaller city of Parkway Village is surrounded by Audubon. George Rogers Clark Park, the site of a cabin owned by the parents of George Rogers Clark, is a prominent feature of the neighborhood.

The northern part of the neighborhood was developed by Harold W. Miller in the 1940s, taking advantage of the popularity of nearby Audubon Park, by subdividing the land into small lots and building inexpensive homes. The southern part of the neighborhood became the site of John J. Audubon Elementary School with the remainder being developed as the Glenafton subdivision in the mid-1960s.

== Demographics ==
In the 2000 census, Audubon had a population of 3,293; of which 96.5% are white, 1.7% are listed as other, 1.6% are black, and 0.2% are Hispanic. College graduates are 31.2% of the population, people without a high school degree are 15.5%. Females outnumber males 52.9% to 47.1%.
