= Positive vorticity advection =

Positive vorticity advection, or PVA, is the result of more cyclonic values of vorticity advecting into lower values of vorticity. It is more generally referred to as "Cyclonic Vorticity Advection" (CVA). In the Northern Hemisphere this is positive, whilst in the Southern Hemisphere it is negative.

== Development ==
Vorticity in the atmosphere is created in three different ways, which are named in their resultant vorticity. These are; Coriolis vorticity, curvature vorticity, and shear vorticity. For example, at the base of a trough, there is curvature and shear vorticity. Curvature vorticity is due to the increasing cyclonic turning as an air parcel enters the trough base. The maximum counter-clockwise spin (positive vorticity in the Northern Hemisphere) is at the trough base. Shear vorticity is caused by the difference in wind speed between air moving through the trough base (typically a jet or jet finger) and slower moving air on either poleward and equatorward side of the faster flow. Consider that slower air to the poleward side will be imparted counter-clockwise spin (picture faster moving air (jet) south and slower air to the north, spin is created). Thus, to the north (poleward) of the trough base an air parcel will experience positive vorticity. Likewise, to the south of the faster flow the air is spun in a clockwise direction (faster air (jet)to the north with slower air to the south, spin is created). Thus, to the south of the faster winds will be an area of negative vorticity.

When these areas of negative and positive vorticity are moved (advected) they produce areas of negative vorticity advection (NVA) and positive vorticity advection (PVA) respectively, downstream from the trough base. The positive vorticity advection area is typically associated with divergence and upward motion. The negative vorticity advection area will be associated with convergence and downward motion.

This produces convergence because of the way the air gains cyclonic vorticity while entering the base of the trough. The opposite happens when air is exiting the base of a trough. This air has more cyclonic vorticity than the air it is entering and therefore produces CVA. CVA produces divergence as a result of how there is a loss of cyclonic vorticity. Coriolis vorticity in this situation is ignored because it acts about the same on all the air flowing through the base of the trough.

== Significance in forecasting ==
The divergence with CVA is significant because it creates forced lift in the atmosphere. This forced lift, in the presence of conditions favorable for atmospheric convection, can cause clouds or precipitation. AVA will do the opposite and lead to a stable atmosphere. In combination with a jet streak, CVA can lead to the amplification of a trough which is significant for forecasting many conditions of the atmosphere.
