= List of tornadoes in the 1974 Super Outbreak =

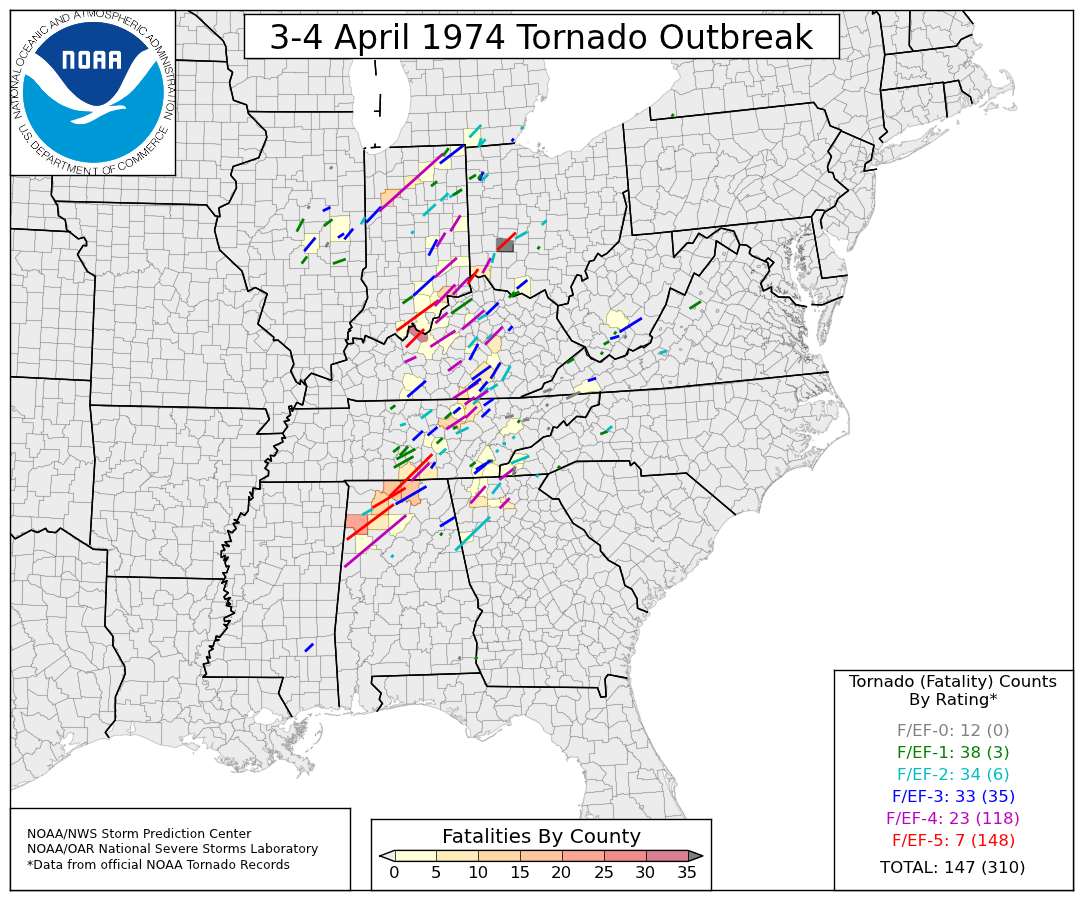
Tracks of the 1974 Super Outbreak's 147 known tornadoes in the United States and fatalities by county.

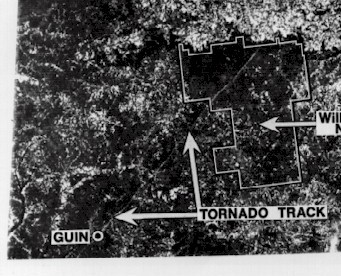
A satellite view of the track of the Guin tornado, one of the seven F5 tornadoes of the outbreak.

On April 3–4, 1974, a violent tornado outbreak described as the outbreak of the century caused widespread devastation across 13 states in the United States and 1 Canadian province. Dubbed the 1974 Super Outbreak and the Jumbo Outbreak, at least 149 tornadoes touched down in a 24-hour period. It is the second-largest continuous outbreak only behind the 2011 Super Outbreak which produced 358 tornadoes over a three-day period. However, the 1974 outbreak remains the most violent on record with 30 F4/5 tornadoes. At times, up to 15 tornadoes were on the ground simultaneously. A team of meteorologists led by Tetsuya Theodore Fujita studied the outbreak, compiling aerial surveys, ground surveys, photographs, and videos to construct a complete picture of the events. A total of 310–335 fatalities and 5,454 to 6,142 injuries are attributed to the outbreak. Destruction of property was widespread and ruinous: 7,512 homes, 2,091 mobile homes, and 3,996 farm buildings were destroyed; 14,336 homes, 909 mobile homes, and 2,871 farm buildings suffered damage; 1,497 small businesses were damaged or destroyed. Total damage exceeded $600 million (1974 USD).

Activity occurred across three rounds throughout the 24-hour event, with the second and third being the most prolific.

The scale of destruction prompted sweeping changes in how public awareness of severe weather was handled and a reorganization of the National Weather Service itself. News broadcasters began running storm coverage beyond normal hours and local governments utilized the Emergency Broadcast System more frequently.

Prior to 1990, there is a likely undercount of tornadoes, particularly E/F0–1, with reports of weaker tornadoes becoming more common as population increased. A sharp increase in the annual average E/F0–1 count by approximately 200 tornadoes was noted upon the deployment of the NEXRAD Doppler weather radar network in 1990–1991. 1974 marked the first year where significant tornado (E/F2+) counts became homogenous with contemporary values, attributed to the consistent implementation of Fujita Scale assessments. Numerous discrepancies on the details of tornadoes in this outbreak exist between sources. The total count of tornadoes and ratings differs from various agencies accordingly. The list below documents information from the most contemporary official sources alongside assessments from tornado historian Thomas Grazulis. All times are listed as described in Abbey and Fujita 1981 unless noted otherwise for consistency.

== Confirmed tornadoes ==
Daily statistics of tornadoes during the Super Outbreak of April 3–4, 1974 (Note: All dates are based Central Standard Time as listed by the National Centers for Environmental Information; however, all times are in Coordinated Universal Time for consistency.)
| Date | Total | Fujita scale rating (Note: The Fujita Scale (F-scale) was used to rate tornado damage from its introduction in the late-1970s through February 1, 2007, when it was succeeded by the Enhanced Fujita Scale (EF-scale). Tornado ratings were retroactively applied to events prior to the formal adoption of the F-scale by the National Weather Service.) | | | | | | Deaths | Injuries | Damage (Note: The National Oceanic and Atmospheric Administration's Storm Data publication does not list exact damage totals for every event, instead giving damage categories. As such, damage for individual tornadoes is not comprehensive.) |
| Date | Total | F0 | F1 | F2 | F3 | F4 | F5 | Deaths | Injuries | Damage |
|---|---|---|---|---|---|---|---|---|---|---|
| April 3 | 130 | 12 | 24 | 33 | 31 | 23 | 7 | 10–11 | 211–254 | >$9,301,000 |
| April 4 | 19 | 6 | 8 | 2 | 3 | 0 | 0 | | | —N/a |
| Total | 149 | 18 | 32 | 35 | 34 | 23 | 7 | 310–335 | 5,454–6,142 | ~$600,000,000 |

Color/symbol key
| Color / symbol | Description |
|---|---|
| § | Data from Shamburger 2015, 2021/2022 |
| † | Data from Grazulis 1990/1993 |
| ♭ | Data from Abbey and Fujita 1981 |
| ¶ | Data from a local National Weather Service office |
| ※ | Data from the 1974 Storm Data publication |
| ‡ | Data from the NCEI database |
| ♯ | Maximum width of tornado |

Confirmed tornadoes during the Super Outbreak of April 3–4, 1974
| F# | Location | County / Parish | State | Coord. (Note: All starting coordinates are based on the NCEI database and may not reflect contemporary analyses) | Date | Time (UTC) (Note: Durations are based on Abbey and Fujita (1981) unless noted otherwise. Letters indicate confidence intervals in the time: A is ±3 minutes; B is ±7 minutes; C is ±15 minutes; D is ±30 minutes; E is ±60 minutes; R is derived from radar.) | Path length | Width (Note: The listed width values are primarily the average/mean width of the tornadoes, with those having known maximum widths denoted by ♯. From 1952 to 1994, reports largely list mean width whereas contemporary years list maximum width.) | Summary | Fujita Tor# |
|---|---|---|---|---|---|---|---|---|---|---|
| F2 | NE of Whitestown | Boone | IN | 40.03°N 86.30°W | April 3 | 13:30‡ | 0.12 mi (0.19 km)※ | 50 yd (46 m)※ | A tornado touched down over an open field. It is listed as a F2 tornado in the National Centers for Environmental Information (NCEI) database; however, Grazulis did not include it in his Significant Tornadoes book and it is not depicted in Ted Fujita's outbreak map. This tornado was produced by a mesoscale convective system that developed ahead of the two main rounds of tornadic activity. | —N/a |
| F0 | Morris | Grundy | IL | 41.37°N 88.42°W | April 3 | 18:10–18:11^{B} | 0.5 mi (0.80 km)♭ | 10 yd (9.1 m)‡ | This was the first tornado associated with the outbreak listed by Fujita. The Storm Data publication lists this event as a funnel cloud that did not reach the ground; accompanying winds caused $1,000 in damage. | 1 |
| F2 | Ellijay to Blue Ridge | Gilmer, Fannin | GA | 34.68°N 84.50°W | April 3 | 18:50–19:20^{B} | 19 mi (31 km)† | 200 yd (180 m)† | 5 injuries — This strong tornado caused extensive damage to homes—some of which had their roof torn off or were otherwise destroyed—trees, and power lines. Five people were injured and losses reached $800,000. The tornado moved close to Cherry Log, damaging several homes in the area. The community of Aska was impacted before the tornado crossed Blue Ridge Lake, damaging homes in the area. Newspaper reports indicate the tornado lifted near Blue Ridge and touched back down near Hemp where one home and several farm buildings were destroyed. Sources differ significantly on the timing of this tornado: the NCEI database lists the tornado as occurring at 18:00 UTC, Grazulis lists 19:15 UTC, and the Storm Data publication lists 23:30 UTC. | 123 |
| F1 | Etowah | McMinn | TN | 35.33°N 84.57°W | April 3 | 19:00–19:05^{D} | 3.3 mi (5.3 km)¶ | 80 yd (73 m)¶♯ | This was the first of two tornadoes to impact Etowah. Damage from this tornado is unspecified; the combined effects are listed under the second Etowah tornado. | 112 |
| F1 | S of Lincoln to McLean | Logan, McLean | IL | 40.12°N 89.33°W | April 3 | 19:03–19:19^{A} | 15 mi (24 km)♭ | 177 yd (162 m)‡ | This tornado moved northeast at a fast pace, roughly 70 mph (110 km/h). It caused $600,000 in property damage in McLean. | 3 |
| F1 | N of West Baden Springs to E of Mitchell | Orange, Lawrence | IN | 38.62°N 86.58°W | April 3 | 19:03–19:20^{B} | 13 mi (21 km)♭ | 177 yd (162 m)‡ | 1 death, 4 injuries — This tornado moved along an intermittent path. South of Orleans, a mobile home and an unoccupied home were destroyed; two people were injured in the former. Another home east of Spring Mill State Park in the Stonington area was destroyed with both occupants injured. A metal shed on the property was blown away and could not be found. Two other homes suffered minor damage. Several trees and power lines were snapped or uprooted. The Storm Data publication lists one fatality and four injuries while the NCEI database lists none. | 34 |
| F3 | SW of Cleveland to N of Benton | Bradley, Polk | TN | 35.10°N 84.92°W | April 3 | 19:03–19:26^{B} | 13 mi (21 km)† | 1,050 yd (960 m)¶# | 1 death. 100 injuries — This was one of two tornadoes to impact areas around Cleveland. Extensive damage to occurred to many homes. A trailer park east of Cleveland was almost completely destroyed, with only 1 of 20 remaining; one person died here. At least 120 homes were damaged, of which 73 were destroyed, in Cleveland. A total of 100 people were injured and damage reached $4.5 million. | 113 |
| F0 | E of Carlock | McLean | IL | 40.58°N 89.03°W | April 3 | 19:07–19:08^{A} | 0.5 mi (0.80 km)♭ | 33 yd (30 m)‡ | A tornado was reported without causing damage. | 2 |
| F0 | Mountain City | Rabun | GA | —N/a | April 3 | 19:09–19:10^{D} | 0.5 mi (0.80 km)♭ | —N/a | Details on this tornado are unspecified. This tornado was omitted from the NCEI database. | 130 |
| F3 | E of Mitchell to ENE of Azalia | Lawrence, Jackson, Bartholomew, Jennings | IN | 38.77°N 86.30°W | April 3 | 19:15–20:05^{B} | 38 mi (61 km)† | 300 yd (270 m)‡ | 1 death, 23 injuries — This tornado moved along an intermittent path, causing extensive damage to farms. A block foundation poultry building, egg farm, and barn were destroyed north of Medora. A well-anchored mobile home was torn from its frame and obliterated, killing the occupant. Continuing toward Jonesville, the tornado caused extensive damage to homes, mobile homes, and farm buildings. A high tension power line collapsed along I-65. "Extreme damage" took place in areas near Acme and Freetown. | 35 |
| F5 | S of Huffman to Depauw to Martinsburg to NE of Underwood | Perry, Crawford, Harrison, Washington, Clark, Scott | IN | 38.07°N 86.75°W | April 3 | 19:16–20:25^{B} | 62 mi (100 km)† | >1,760 yd (1,610 m)†♯ | 6–7 deaths, 76–95 injuries – See section on this tornado – This was the first of seven F5 tornadoes to touch down during the outbreak. It caused extensive damage to small communities, with the worst occurring in Depauw and Martinsburg. In the latter, 38 of the town's 48 homes were destroyed. Six or seven people were killed and 76–95 people were injured by this tornado. | 40 |
| F3 | WSW of Decatur to W of Oreana | Christian, Macon | IL | 39.72°N 89.13°W | April 3 | 19:30–19:50^{B} | 19 mi (31 km)† | 350 yd (320 m)‡ | 1 death, ≥26 injuries — See section on this tornado | 5 |
| F0± | SE of Murphy | Cherokee | NC | 35.05°N 83.95°W | April 3 | 19:40–19:41^{C} | 0.5 mi (0.80 km)♭ | —N/a | Fujita rated this tornado F0; however, the NCEI database lists is as a F1 tornado. | 124 |
| F3 | SSW of Colfax to E of Anchor | McLean | IL | 40.52°N 88.62°W | April 3 | 19:48–19:57^{A} | 8 mi (13 km)† | 350 yd (320 m)‡ | A multiple vortex tornado destroyed two homes and damaged eight farms. Another home was lifted off its foundation. Debris was lofted up to 10 mi (16 km) away. Chicken coops were destroyed, killing many. Farm equipment was mangled beyond recognition. The multiple vortex nature of the tornado was most evident near Anchor where corn stubble was destroyed in spiraling patterns. Damage was estimated at $700,000. Hundreds of local residents assisted farmers with the clean up. | 4 |
| F3 | NW of Shelbyville to NE of Greenfield | Shelby, Hancock | IN | 39.58°N 85.87°W | April 3 | 19:50–20:10^{A} | 17 mi (27 km)† | 1,760 yd (1,610 m)※ | 25 injuries — See section on this tornado family | 31 |
| F1 | Owaneco | Christian | IL | 39.47°N 89.20°W | April 3 | 19:47–19:56^{A} | 8 mi (13 km)♭ | 70 yd (64 m)‡ | Several homes suffered roof damage in Owaneco. Two-hundred farmers assisted with debris clean up. | 7 |
| F4+ | SE of Grammer to Hamburg to S of Laurel | Bartholomew, Decatur, Franklin | IN | 39.13°N 85.72°W | April 3 | 20:00–20:42^{B} | 37 mi (60 km)† | 1,200 yd (1,100 m)¶# | 4 deaths, 17 injuries — About 3 mi (4.8 km) southwest of New Point, a farmstead was completely leveled. Grazulis assessed damage here to be near-F5 intensity. An April 19, 1974, states damage was "definitely...at [F5] level in Hamburg." Two people were killed southeast of Greensburg when their home was destroyed. Seven planes were destroyed at the Puttman Airport near the town, one of which was thrown 500 ft (150 m). Damage to the airport exceeded $100,000. Tremendous damage occurred in Hamburg where 90 percent of the town was damaged or destroyed. Only six of the town's homes were left standing. A mother and daughter died when their mobile home was hurled into a tree. | 36 |
| F4 | E of Westland to Grant City to Kennard to N of Cadiz | Hancock, Rush, Henry | IN | 39.58°N 85.87°W | April 3 | 20:02–20:25^{A} | 20 mi (32 km)† | 1,000 yd (910 m)※ | 1 death, 17 injuries — See section on this tornado family | 32 |
| F1± | NE of Maryville | Blount | TN | 35.78°N 83.92°W | April 3 | 20:09–20:10^{C} | 1 mi (1.6 km)♭ | 150 yd (140 m)¶# | 1–2 injuries — A brief tornado touched down near Maryville; one or two people were reportedly injured. Seven mobile homes were destroyed and a few homes sustained roof damage. The NCEI database and National Weather Service Office in Morristown, Tennessee, list this as a F2 tornado; however, Fujita rated as F1 and Grazulis does not list this event in his Significant Tornadoes book. | 111 |
| F1 | SE of Farmer City to W of Fisher | Piatt, Champaign | IL | 40.22°N 88.60°W | April 3 | 20:14–20:27^{B} | 13 mi (21 km)♭ | 20 yd (18 m)‡ | A large barn and corn crib were destroyed. | 6 |
| F4 | NE of Henryville to Hanover to Madison to W of Cross Plains | Clark, Scott, Jefferson, Ripley | IN | 38.55°N 85.75°W | April 3 | 20:19–21:06^{B} | 38 mi (61 km)† | 1,760 yd (1,610 m) | 11 deaths, 190 injuries — See section on this tornado | 41 |
| F0 | NE of Hammond | Piatt | IL | 39.80°N 88.57°W | April 3 | 20:20–20:25^{B} | 4 mi (6.4 km)♭ | 20 yd (18 m)‡ | A tree was knocked over onto a car in Pierson. | 8 |
| F1§ | SE of Cunningham | Montgomery | TN | 36.38°N 87.37°W | April 3 | 20:30 | 0.25 mi (0.40 km) | 25 yd (23 m)♯ | This brief tornado was unreported prior to Shamburger's 2021 reanalysis of Middle Tennessee tornadoes. One mobile home was destroyed, with debris scattered hundreds of yards away. | —N/a |
| F5 | SW of Hardinsburg, KY, to Brandenburg, KY, to NNW of Laconia, IN | Breckinridge (KY), Meade (KY), Harrison (IN) | KY, IN | 37.73°N 86.53°W | April 3 | 20:30–21:22^{A} | 34 mi (55 km)† | 800 yd (730 m)† | 31 deaths, 270 injuries — See article on this tornado | 47 |
| F5 | SW of Xenia to Downtown Xenia to N of South Charleston | Greene, Clark | OH | 39.63°N 84.05°W | April 3 | 20:32–21:09^{A} | 32 mi (51 km)† | 1,300 yd (1,200 m)‡♯ | 34–36 deaths, 1,150 injuries — See article on this tornado | 37 |
| F1 | NW of Cleveland | Hamilton | TN | 35.25°N 85.02°W | April 3 | 20:33–20:40^{C} | 5.9 mi (9.5 km)¶ | 80 yd (73 m)¶# | Details on this tornado are unspecified. | 109 |
| F4 | SW of Blountsville to N of Ridgeville | Henry, Delaware, Randolph, Jay | IN | 40.05°N 85.27°W | April 3 | 20:35–20:58^{A} | 22 mi (35 km)† | ≥1,760 yd (1,610 m)†# | 1 death, 12 injuries — See section on this tornado family | 33 |
| F3 | E of Tolono to N of Philo | Champaign | IL | 39.98°N 88.23°W | April 3 | 20:44–20:52^{A} | 8 mi (13 km)† | 70 yd (64 m)† | 1 death — One person was killed near where the tornado touched down when their mobile home was lofted and obliterated. Northeast of Tolono, a barn and three toolsheds were destroyed and five cows were killed on the property. The most severe damage occurred on four farmsteads west of Philo where many buildings were destroyed. The Storm Data publication lists this tornado as continuing into Vermillion County; however, contemporary analyses indicate that two separate tornadoes occurred with another F3 forming to the southeast. Damage from the three tornadoes in Champaign reached $800,000. | 9 |
| F3 | ENE of Cleveland to southern Etowah | Bradley, Polk, McMinn | TN | 35.18°N 84.87°W | April 3 | 20:55–21:26^{A} | 24 mi (39 km)† | ≥1,500 yd (1,400 m)¶# | 3 deaths, 50 injuries — This was the second tornado to strike Etowah. The two tornadoes severely damaged 100 homes and a large shopping plaza across Bradley County. One person was killed in Cleveland and two in Etowah. Thirty-seven homes were damaged or destroyed in McMinn County. | 114 |
| F3 | S of Sydney to E of Ogden | Champaign, Vermillion | IL | 39.95°N 88.07°W | April 3 | 20:58–21:14^{A} | 17 mi (27 km)† | 350 yd (320 m)‡ | Shortly after the 20:44 UTC F3 Tolono tornado dissipated, the same supercell produced another tornado near Sydney. Moving on a brisk northeast trajectory, the tornado struck the Homer Lake Park Preserve. The park headquarters and several homes were destroyed. Aerial surveys by Fujita revealed a large area of ground scouring from two suction vortices near Homer Lake. Three semi trucks and three cars were blown off of I-74 just east of Ogden. No one was injured in those vehicles but one person was injured in a subsequent accident related to them. | 10 |
| F4 | W of Caneyville to Big Clifty | Grayson, Hardin | KY | 37.42°N 86.57°W | April 3 | 21:00–21:34^{B} | 28 mi (45 km)† | 150 yd (140 m)† | 2 injuries — One home was leveled near Caneyville. | 52 |
| F0± | SSW of Rosman | Transylvania | NC | 35.12°N 82.83°W | April 3 | 21:00–21:01^{D} | 1 mi (1.6 km)‡ | 30 yd (27 m)‡ | Details on this tornado are unspecified. Fujita rated this as a F0 tornado; however, the NCEI database lists this as a F1 tornado. | 132 |
| F2 | SW of Florence to London to SW of West Jefferson | Clark, Madison | OH | 39.78°N 83.72°W | April 3 | 21:01–21:20^{A} | 15 mi (24 km)† | 180 yd (160 m)† | As the Xenia tornado weakened, a second tornado formed to the east near Florence. It produced F2 damage along its path, destroying trailers, grain bins, and a warehouse. A few structures were damaged in the center of London. This tornado was initially believed to have just been thunderstorm winds based on public reports of no funnel cloud. | 38 |
| F4 | S of Manville to Aurora | Jefferson, Switzerland, Ohio, Dearborn | IN | 38.77°N 85.27°W | April 3 | 21:04–21:29^{A} | 28 mi (45 km)† | 1,133 yd (1,036 m)‡ | This tornado formed as the 20:19 UTC Henryville–Cross Plains, Indiana, F4 tornado was dissipating. The two tornadoes were on the ground simultaneously near Madison. A third funnel was reported but it did not touch down. Homes and forests were totally destroyed west of Fairview and a church was demolished north of Bear Branch. As this tornado weakened and turned north, another tornado formed to its southeast. | 42 |
| F1 | W of Springfield | Robertson | TN | 36.48°N 86.98°W | April 3 | 21:05–21:11^{B} | 6 mi (9.7 km)§ | 50 yd (46 m)§# | Shamburger 2021 and the NCEI database list this as a F1 tornado. Fujita rated this as a F0 tornado. | 60 |
| F2 | Concord | Jefferson | AL | 33.45°N 87.05°W | April 3 | 21:15–21:21:16^{C} | 1 mi (1.6 km)† | 800 yd (730 m)†# | A brief tornado destroyed an outbuilding and trailer and damaged one home. | 104 |
| F2 | Bismarck | Vermillion | IL | 40.25°N 87.63°W | April 3 | 21:18–21:25^{A} | 7 mi (11 km)† | 175 yd (160 m)† | 12 injuries — The local high school was damaged and several homes were destroyed. Monetary losses reached $1 million. Twelve people sustained injuries. | 11 |
| F1 | S of Mattoon to NE of Charleston | Coles | IL | 33.45°N 87.05°W | April 3 | 21:22–21:33^{B} | 14.8 mi (23.8 km)‡ | 70 yd (64 m)‡ | A home and barns were damaged on a farmstead and several homes were damaged around Charleston. A 100 ft (30 m) antenna was folded in half. The 1974 Storm Data publication states that six funnel clouds were observed around Charleston with no confirmed tornado; however, this event was later classified as a tornado by Fujita. | 17 |
| F5 | N of Rising Sun, IN, to Belleview, KY, to Sayler Park | Ohio (IN), Boone (KY), Hamilton (OH) | IN, KY, OH | 38.97°N 84.88°W | April 3 | 21:28–21:51^{B} | 21 mi (34 km)† | 1,320 yd (1,210 m)※# | 3 deaths, 210 injuries — See article on this tornado | 43 |
| F3 | W of Gold City to E of Smiths Grove | Simpson, Warren, Barren | KY | 36.72°N 86.53°W | April 3 | 21:34–22:05^{B} | 25 mi (40 km)† | —N/a | 40 barns and seven homes were wrecked at Temperance. | 61 |
| F3 | W of Attica to Rainsville to S of Judy | Warren, Benton | IN | 40.28°N 87.48°W | April 3 | 21:37–22:02^{B} | 26 mi (42 km)† | 700 yd (640 m)† | The entire community of Rainsville, 20 homes in all, was damaged. | 12 |
| F4 | Louisville to W of Buckner | Jefferson, Oldham | KY | 38.20°N 85.75°W | April 3 | 21:37–21:59^{A} | 21 mi (34 km)† | 200 yd (180 m)† | 2 deaths, 228 injuries — See section on this tornado | 48 |
| F2± | Ballplay | Monroe | TN | 35.52°N 84.35°W | April 3 | 21:37–21:50^{C} | 9 mi (14 km)♭ | 600 yd (550 m)¶# | Seven homes and several barns were destroyed or severely damaged. The NWS Office in Morristown, Tennessee, lists this as a F2 tornado. Fujita rated this as a F1 tornado and Grazulis does not list this event in his Significant Tornadoes book. | 115 |
| F4 | NW of Elizabethtown to N of Farfield | Hardin, Bullitt, Nelson, Spencer | KY | 37.72°N 85.90°W | April 3 | 21:43–22:33^{A} | 42 mi (68 km)† | 400 yd (370 m)† | "Several" homes in Nelson County sustained F4-level damage, being described as "leveled". | 53 |
| F4 | W of Otterbein to Monticello to Ligonier to NW of Wolcottville | Benton, Tippecanoe, White, Cass, Pulaski, Fulton, Marshall, Kosciusko, Elkhart, Noble, Lagrange | IN | 40.50°N 87.13°W | April 3 | 21:47–23:47^{A} | 121 mi (195 km)† | 1,760 yd (1,610 m)‡ | 18 deaths, 362 injuries — See section on this tornado According to Grazulis, this was likely a family of three distinct tornadoes rather than a single, continuous event. | 13 |
| F4 | Northeastern Cincinnati to N of Mason | Hamilton, Butler, Warren | OH | 39.18°N 84.48°W | April 3 | 21:52–23:14^{B} | 20 mi (32 km)† | 350 yd (320 m)‡ | 2 deaths, 39 injuries — This violent tornado damaged 100 homes in and around Mason, Ohio, completely destroying "a few" of these. Both fatalities were in a mobile home south of Mason. | 44 |
| F2† | Paris | Edgar | IL | —N/a | April 3 | 22:00–22:02^{C} | 2 mi (3.2 km)† | —N/a | This brief tornado destroyed a barn and mobile home and shifted two frame homes off their foundation. This tornado was omitted from the NCEI database. | 18 |
| F3 | SE of Ellisville to ENE of Laurel | Jones | MS | 31.55°N 89.18°W | April 3 | 22:00–22:19^{C} | 12 mi (19 km)† | 150 yd (140 m)† | 1 injury — This tornado moved along an intermittent path from MS 29 to MS 15 to east-northeast of Laruel. A pecan grove was damaged near MS 29. It destroyed 1 home, damaged 35 others, and damaged or destroyed 30 farm buildings. A chicken house was destroyed, killing 15,000 chickens inside. Damage was estimated at $150,000. One person was injured by flying debris. | 105 |
| F1 | SE of La Grange to SW of Jonesville | Oldham, Henry, Owen | KY | 38.38°N 85.33°W | April 3 | 22:04–22:27^{B} | 21.3 mi (34.3 km)‡ | —N/a | | 49 |
| F2+ | Southeastern Nashville | Williamson, Davidson | TN | 35.99°N 86.69°W§ | April 3 | 22:07–22:20^{A} | 12 mi (19 km)§ | 400 yd (370 m)§# | 1 death — One person died from a heart attack as the tornado approached Percy Priest Lake. Grazulis and Shamburger assert this tornado was likely of F3 intensity. | 67 |
| F2 | Greenback | Loudon | TN | 35.67°N 84.17°W | April 3 | 22:09–22:11^{A} | 2 mi (3.2 km)† | 300 yd (270 m)¶# | Seven homes were damaged in Greenback, one of which had its roof removed. | 110 |
| F2 | S of Lebanon to NE of Pekin | Warren | OH | 39.38°N 84.23°W | April 3 | 22:12–22:22^{B} | 10 mi (16 km)† | 175 yd (160 m)† | | 45 |
| F2 | W of New Albany | Franklin | OH | 40.08°N 82.85°W | April 3 | 22:13–22:18^{C} | 5 mi (8.0 km)† | 90 yd (82 m)† | Nearly an hour after the 21:01 UTC F2 London tornado dissipated, a third tornado from the Xenia supercell formed near New Albany. It destroyed 3 barns and 1 home and damaged 20 other homes. A 345,000 volt transmission line was torn from its tower. | 39 |
| F0± | W of Circleville | Pickaway | OH | 39.60°N 83.00°W | April 3 | 22:18–22:19^{A} | 1 mi (1.6 km)‡ | 10 yd (9.1 m)‡ | Fujita lists this as a F0 tornado; however, the NCEI database lists it as a F1. Seven people were injured. | 50 |
| F1 | NW of Jacksonville | Calhoun | AL | 33.87°N 85.83°W | April 3 | 22:21–22:22^{B} | 1 mi (1.6 km)‡ | 800 yd (730 m)‡ | | 126 |
| F1 | SE of Columbia to NW of Chapel Hill§ | Maury, Marshall§ | TN | 35.59°N 86.94°W§ | April 3 | 22:25–22:37^{C} | 10 mi (16 km)§ | 100 yd (91 m)§# | | 71 |
| F2 | SE of Heflin, AL, to S of Pine Log Mountain | Cleburne (AL), Haralson (GA), Paulding (GA), Cobb (GA), Bartow (GA), Cherokee (GA) | AL, GA | 33.55°N 85.47°W | April 3 | 22:29–00:00^{B} | 65 mi (105 km)† | 200 yd (180 m)† | 1 death, 20 injuries — This long-lived tornado touched down southeast of Heflin near the Alabama-Georgia border. Only minor tree damage occurred before it moved into Georgia. Newspaper reports indicated this was originally considered to be several tornadoes. Seven members of one family were injured in Buchanan, one of whom was a pregnant mother who was in critical condition. Her child was stillborn in the hospital and listed as the sole fatality from this tornado. Eight people were injured in Yorkville in Paulding County. Power outages accompanied the tornado as it moved through northern Cobb County. A mobile home park was damaged near Cartersville in Bartow County, resulting in several injuries. In Cherokee County, damage was reported to homes along SR 92. Damage was estimated at $2 million. | 127 |
| F3 | SW of Centre to Alexis | Cherokee | AL | 34.05°N 85.82°W | April 3 | 22:35–22:48^{B} | 14 mi (23 km)† | 800 yd (730 m) | The NCEI database lists this tornado as occurring at 00:00 UTC and has a path length of 20.9 mi (33.6 km). | 118 |
| F4 | S of Greensburg to Mannsville | Green, Taylor | KY | 37.22°N 85.47°W | April 3 | 22:40–23:08^{B} | 29 mi (47 km)† | 800 yd (730 m)† | | 62 |
| F3†§ | NE of Lebanon to Dickson Springs | Wilson, Trousdale, Smith | TN | 36.23°N 86.24°W§ | April 3 | 22:50–23:13^{A} | 18 mi (29 km)§ | 300 yd (270 m)§ | A trailer was destroyed east of Lebanon. This event was listed as a F2 tornado in the NCEI database; however, Fujita, Grazulis, and Shamburger assessed it as a F3. Grazulis further indicated that it was near-F4 levels in Dickson Springs. | 68 |
| F4 | Alton to Frankfort to Stamping Ground | Anderson, Franklin, Scott | KY | 38.05°N 85.07°W | April 3 | 22:50–23:28^{B} | 36 mi (58 km)† | 800 yd (730 m)† | | 54 |
| F2 | NW of Phil Campbell to Oak Grove | Franklin | AL | 34.33°N 87.73°W | April 3 | 23:01–23:15^{B} | 12 mi (19 km)† | 350 yd (320 m)† | This tornado was originally considered to be part of the 23:50 UTC F5 Mount Hope–Harvest event. | 95 |
| F3 | NW of Downtown Murfreesboro to Statesville | Rutherford, Wilson | TN | 35.87°N 86.42°W§ | April 3 | 23:03–23:26^{C} | 19 mi (31 km)§ | 100 yd (91 m)§ | This tornado formed at the end of a damaging rear-flank downdraft within the Murfreesboro city limits. After touching down, the tornado downed trees and caused minor damage to homes around the Stones River Golf Course. Continuing northeast across northern areas of Murfreesboro, the tornado caused minor damage to many structures. Five homes were destroyed in the Valley View community north of Murfreesboro. Three homes sustained severe damage near Lancassas. Beyond this point, the tornado's track is uncertain but it is believed to have continued into Wilson County and dissipated near Statesville. Newspaper reports from The Tennessean state 20 injuries occurred in the Murfreesboro area; however, these were not attributed to the tornado by Shamburger 2021 or Fujita. | 72 |
| F3 | SW of Hustonville to Junction City to Herrington Lake | Casey, Lincoln, Boyle | KY | 37.43°N 84.92°W | April 3 | 23:10–23:55^{B} | 18 mi (29 km)† | —N/a | | 63 |
| F2§ | NW of Lewisburg to N of Unionville | Marshall, Bedford | TN | 35.46°N 86.84°W§ | April 3 | 23:14–23:34^{C} | 20 mi (32 km)§ | 200 yd (180 m)§# | Originally rated F1 by Fujita and later reassessed as a F2 by Shamburger 2022. However, Grazulis did not list this event in his Significant Tornadoes book. | 78 |
| F1 | N of Farmington to SE of Unionville | Marshall, Bedford | TN | 35.50°N 86.74°W§ | April 3 | 23:14–23:45^{B} | 15 mi (24 km)§ | —N/a | | 79 |
| F5 | Mount Hope to Moulton to ESE of Harvest | Lawrence, Morgan, Limestone, Madison | AL | 34.33°N 87.73°W | April 3 | 23:20–00:21^{B} | 51 mi (82 km)† | >1,320 yd (1,210 m)†♯ | 28 deaths, 267–280 injuries — See section on this tornado | 96 |
| F4 | SW of Sugar Valley to NW of Resaca | Gordon, Whitfield, Murray | GA | 34.50°N 85.05°W | April 3 | 23:30–00:00^{C} | 26 mi (42 km)† | 880 yd (800 m)¶# | 9–10 deaths – This violent tornado touched down near Sugar Valley and leveled homes along the from east side of town northeast toward Resaca. More than 50,000 chickens were killed in Gordon County. Seven people, four from one family and three from another, were killed in the Sugar Hill area. Two people were killed in a mobile home park near Dalton. In Chatsworth, the wall of a rug mill collapsed, trapping 60 people for several hours; one person died here and the mill suffered $5 million in losses. Local NWS surveys indicated a maximum width around 0.5 mi (0.80 km). At least 200 people were injured. The NCEI database erroneously lists this tornado as occurring an hour earlier. | 119 |
| F3 | S of Oakwood to NW of Continental | Paulding, Putnam | OH | 41.03°N 84.40°W | April 3 | 23:33–23:43^{B} | 10 mi (16 km)† | 350 yd (320 m)‡ | Storm Data lists the event time at approximately 22:30 UTC; the NCEI database lists this tornado as occurring at 00:45 UTC. | 27 |
| F1 | SE of North Manchester | Wabash, Whitley | IN | 40.97°N 85.73°W | April 3 | 23:35–23:45^{D} | 7.1 mi (11.4 km)‡ | 90 yd (82 m)‡ | Details on this tornado are unspecified. | 19 |
| F4 | S of Kettle to Ida to Piney Woods to Mill Springs | Cumberland, Clinton, Wayne | KY | 36.65°N 85.37°W | April 3 | 23:35–00:04^{B} | 30 mi (48 km)† | 1,760 yd (1,610 m)# | | 69 |
| F4 | NNW of Aliceville to Jasper to Cullman to Fairview | Pickens, Tuscaloosa, Fayette, Walker, Cullman | AL | 33.27°N 88.20°W | April 3 | 23:44–01:48^{A} | 103 mi (166 km)† | 800 yd (730 m)‡ | | 103 |
| F2 | Windfall to Swayzee to E of Sweetser | Tipton, Howard, Grant | IN | 40.38°N 85.97°W | April 3 | 23:45–00:08^{B} | 19 mi (31 km)† | 350 yd (320 m)† | 12 injuries — Twelve people were injured. A trailer park in the southeastern corner of Swayzee was largely destroyed; eight people were injured here. Natural gas lines were damaged across town, sparking several fires. | 21 |
| F1 | SE of Lagrange | Lagrange | IN | 41.58°N 85.38°W | April 3 | 23:51–23:59^{B} | 8.8 mi (14.2 km)‡ | 350 yd (320 m)‡ | Details on this tornado are unspecified. | 14 |
| F3 | SW of Brimfield to S of South Milford to NNW of Freemont | Noble, Lagrange, Steuben | IN | 41.42°N 85.47°W | April 3 | 23:53–00:29^{B} | 36 mi (58 km)† | 700 yd (640 m) | The Storm Data publication indicates this tornado continued for an additional 34 mi (55 km) into Michigan; however, this is not supported by contemporary analyses. | 15 |
| F3 | Lees Lick to Poindexter to Claysville | Harrison, Robertson | KY | 38.33°N 84.43°W | April 3 | 23:55–00:21^{B} | 25 mi (40 km)† | —N/a | | 55 |
| F3 | WNW of Monticello to W of Burnside | Wayne, Pulaski | KY | 36.85°N 84.97°W | April 3 | 23:56–00:24^{B} | 24 mi (39 km)† | 150 yd (140 m)† | This tornado was on the ground simultaneously in Wayne County with the 23:40 UTC Kettle–Mill Springs F4 tornado. | 70 |
| F1 | Aberdeen, OH | Butler (KY), Brown (OH), Adams (OH) | KY, OH | 38.67°N 83.75°W | April 3 | 00:10–00:20^{E} | 9.1 mi (14.6 km)‡ | 180 yd (160 m)‡ | Fujita's analysis indicates this tornado began aloft near Maysville and touched down along the North Fork Licking River by the Kentucky–Ohio border. Details on the impacts of this tornado are unspecified. The exact timing of this tornado is very uncertain; The NCEI database lists a duplicate event for Maysville at 01:25 UTC. | 56 |
| F2 | Robbinsville to Stecoah | Graham, Swain | NC | 35.33°N 83.82°W† | April 3 | 00:10–00:25^{C} | 12 mi (19 km)† | —N/a | Storm Data lists this as part of a long-lived tornado originating in Cherokee County. Significant discrepancies exist for this tornado. Storm Data lists this part of a long-lived, intermittent tornado that tracked across Cherokee, Graham, and Swain counties. However, the publication indicates it touched down three hours later. | 117 |
| F2 | W of Danville to eastern Pleasant Hill to NE of Harrodsburg | Boyle, Mercer | KY | 37.68°N 84.93°W | April 3 | 00:15–00:35^{A} | 18 mi (29 km)† | —N/a | | 58 |
| F2 | SW of Bluffton to W of Peterson | Wells, Adams | IN | 40.73°N 85.25°W | April 3 | 00:15–00:27^{C} | 12 mi (19 km)† | 175 yd (160 m)† | | 24 |
| F3 | SE of Readyville to Dowelltown | Cannon, DeKalb | TN | 35.81°N 86.16°W¶ | April 3 | 00:17–00:35^{C} | 20 mi (32 km)¶ | 100 yd (91 m)¶ | The Dowelltown Manufacturing Co. was destroyed, leaving 200 people unemployed. | 80 |
| F4 | Cottonburg to N of Richmond to E of Mount Sterling | Garrard, Madison, Clark | KY | 37.72°N 84.50°W | April 3 | 00:18–00:57^{B} | 35 mi (56 km)† | 400 yd (370 m) | 7 deaths, 28 injuries — This tornado predominantly tracked through rural areas. The majority of damage occurred near Richmond, with thirty homes destroyed. | 64 |
| F3 | WNW of West Union to E of Peebles | Adams | KY | 38.67°N 83.75°W | April 3 | 00:20–00:37^{B} | 16 mi (26 km)† | 150 yd (140 m)† | | 51 |
| F2 | SW of Warren to S of Markle | Huntington | IN | 40.67°N 85.50°W | April 3 | 00:20–00:30^{C} | 11 mi (18 km)† | 350 yd (320 m)† | | 22 |
| F4 | Ball Ground to Juno to W of Dahlonega | Cherokee, Pickens, Dawson, Lumpkin | GA | 34.37°N 84.33°W | April 3 | 00:22–00:53^{B} | 24 mi (39 km)† | 200 yd (180 m)† | One person was killed and three others were injured near Marble Hill in Pickens County. | 128 |
| F1 | NNE of Bluffton to NW of Decatur | Wells, Adams | IN | 40.77°N 85.15°W | April 3 | 00:25–00:40^{C} | 10.9 mi (17.5 km)‡ | 350 yd (320 m)‡ | Details on this tornado are unspecified. | 26 |
| F2± | SW of Melrose to N of Oakwood | Paulding | OH | 41.08°N 84.47°W | April 3 | 00:26–00:34^{A} | 8 mi (13 km)† | 175 yd (160 m)† | Fujita and Grazulis list this as a F2 tornado. The NCEI database lists this as a F1 tornado. | 25 |
| F5 | SSW of Athens, AL, to Tanner, AL, to Capshaw, AL, to Harvest, AL, to Flintville, TN† | Limestone (AL), Madison (AL), Lincoln (TN), Franklin (TN) | AL, TN | 34.70°N 87.05°W | April 3 | 00:30–01:25^{B} | 50 mi (80 km)† | 800 yd (730 m)§ | 22–27 deaths, 250–270 injuries — See section on this tornado | 98 |
| F1± | Berlin Township | Monroe | MI | 42.03°N 83.25°W | April 3 | 00:30–00:31^{C} | 2 mi (3.2 km)† | 30 yd (27 m)† | A barn and shed were destroyed and other buildings were damaged near Estral Beach. Fujita analyzed this as a F1 tornado and Grazulis does not list it in his Significant Tornadoes book. The NCEI database lists this as a F2 tornado. This may have been the same tornado that struck Windsor, Ontario. | 29 |
| F3 | Northeastern Gilmer County to NW of Blue Ridge | Gilmer, Fannin | GA | —N/a | April 3 | 00:40–01:06^{B} | 17 mi (27 km)† | 200 yd (180 m)† | Fujita and Grazulis list a F3 tornado. This tornado is omitted from the NCEI database. | 120 |
| F2 | W of Hillsdale to W of Clark Lake | Hillsdale, Jackson | MI | 42.03°N 83.25°W | April 3 | 00:44–00:59^{B} | 21 mi (34 km)† | 440 yd (400 m)‡ | 2–3 deaths, 31 injuries — A total of 160 homes and businesses were damaged or destroyed. Thirty-one people were injured, mostly in mobile homes. Twenty trailers were destroyed and others were flipped over in a mobile home park north of Hillsdale; only five people were injured here as most sought refuge in a concrete building. Fifty homes were damaged or destroyed along Goose Lake and four people were injured. Forty homes and cottages were damaged or destroyed around Lake LeAnn, two of which "simply disappeared." Two people were killed in North Adams when a tree fell on their trailer. A third person died in Jerome; however, this fatality is not listed by Fujita or Grazulis. The Storm Data publication states that this tornado originated in Indiana and tracked through Branch County, with the total path length reaching 34 mi (55 km). Newspaper reports indicate the tornado aloft was sighted in five other counties. | 16 |
| F2 | SE of Lexington | Madison, Fayette | KY | 37.83°N 84.43°W | April 3 | 00:45–00:55^{C} | 9 mi (14 km)† | —N/a | | 59 |
| F4 | SW of Flintville to AEDC | Lincoln, Franklin, Coffee§ | TN | 34.99°N 86.48°W§ | April 3 | 00:45–01:25^{B} | 40 mi (64 km)§ | 800 yd (730 m)§ | | 97 |
| F0 | Apalachia Dam | Cherokee | NC | —N/a | April 3 | 00:55–00:59^{B} | 3 mi (4.8 km) | —N/a | Significant discrepancies exist for this tornado. Storm Data lists this as the beginning of a long-lived, intermittent tornado that tracked across Cherokee, Graham, and Swain counties. However, the latter half of the track was a tornado that occurred 40 minutes earlier. | 116 |
| F2¶ | W of Cummins Falls State Park to WNW of Rickman¶ | Jackson, Putnam¶ | TN | 36.25°N 85.61°W¶ | April 3 | 00:55–01:07^{C} | 8 mi (13 km)¶ | 200 yd (180 m)¶ | Original assessments indicated the tornado tracked from Jackson County into Overton; however, later analysis showed a track farther south from Jackson into Putnam. The analysis also revealed it to be stronger, with a rating of F2. Fujita rated this as a F1 tornado and Grazulis did not list this event in his Significant Tornadoes book, indicating a rating below F2. | 81 |
| F3 | N of Ano to Elgin | Pulaski, Rockcastle, Jackson | KY | 37.02°N 84.87°W | April 3 | 00:55–01:30^{C} | 30 mi (48 km)† | 600 yd (550 m)† | The NCEI database lists this tornado as occurring at 04:30 UTC | 84 |
| F4 | Boone National Forest | Wayne, McCreary | KY | 36.63°N 84.78°W | April 3 | 01:04–01:32^{R} | 26 mi (42 km)† | 500 yd (460 m)† | The NCEI database lists this tornado as occurring at 03:00 UTC. | 74 |
| F1±† | SE of Mount Sterling | Montgomery | KY | 37.98°N 83.88°W | April 3 | 01:05–01:13^{B} | 4.9 mi (7.9 km)‡ | —N/a | This tornado is listed as a F3 in the NCEI database; Fujita rated this tornado as a F1 and Grazulis does not list it in his Significant Tornadoes book. | 65 |
| F2 | Waldron to SE of Hudson | Hillsdale, Lenawee | MI | 41.75°N 84.42°W | April 3 | 01:05–01:10^{C} | 10 mi (16 km)† | 440 yd (400 m)† | 3 injuries — It is uncertain whether this was a single tornado or two distinct events. A barn was destroyed and a home had its roof torn off near Prattville. One person was injured near Waldron when debris from a barn was thrown into a nearby home. Two people were injured near Hudson when their mobile home was destroyed. | 20 |
| F4 | Macedonia to SE of Cookeville to SE of Crawford¶ | White, Putnam, Overton¶ | TN | 36.03°N 85.59°W¶ | April 3 | 01:05–01:39^{C} | 30 mi (48 km)¶ | 700 yd (640 m)¶ | This tornado was originally believed to have continued into Fentress County; however, contemporary analysis indicates it was two separate tornadoes, with the first lifting before reaching the Overton–Fentress County line. | 86 |
| F2± | Windsor, ON, to Grosse Pointe, MI | Essex (ON), Monroe (MI) | ON (Canada), MI | —N/a | April 3 | 01:09–01:16^{B} | 6–14 mi (9.7–22.5 km) | 200–300 m (220–330 yd) | 9 deaths, 10–25 injuries — See section on this tornado | 30 |
| F2 | SE of Stamping Ground to Muddy Ford | Scott | KY | 38.23°N 84.65°W | April 3 | 01:13–01:28^{B} | 14 mi (23 km)‡ | —N/a | | 57 |
| F2+ | Big South Fork National River and Recreation Area | Fentress (TN), Pickett (TN), Scott (TN), McCreary (KY) | TN, KY | 36.51°N 84.82°W§ | April 3 | 01:15–01:35^{C} | 20 mi (32 km)†§ | 800 yd (730 m)§# | Based on satellite imagery depicting the damage path nearly 50 years after the tornado, Shamburger 2022 suggests the tornado may have been of F3 or F4 intensity. | 75 |
| F4 | SE of McCaysville, GA, to Murphy, NC to SW of Marble, NC | Fannin (GA), Cherokee (NC) | GA, NC | 34.95°N 84.30°W | April 3 | 01:15–01:45^{B} | 22 mi (35 km)† | 1,050 yd (960 m)¶# | 3 deaths, 40 injuries — The tornado struck southeastern Murpy, damaging or destroying 45 homes and 17 mobile homes. Three fatalities occurred in the city. Forty people were injured overall. It reached a width of nearly three-quarters of a mile. The NCEI database erroneously duplicates this event. | 121 |
| F2† | NE of Payne to SW of Paulding | Paulding | OH | 41.08°N 84.70°W | April 3 | 01:16–01:23^{A} | 7 mi (11 km)† | 90 yd (82 m)† | | 23 |
| F1 | Livingston | Overton | TN | 36.43°N 85.21°W¶ | April 3 | 01:20–01:25^{C} | 4 mi (6.4 km)¶ | 200 yd (180 m)¶# | | 73 |
| F4 | Faix, TN, to Moodyville, TN, to W of Mount Pisgah | Pickett (TN), Wayne (KY) | TN, KY | 36.50°N 85.13°W§ | April 3 | 01:25–01:50^{B} | 19 mi (31 km)§ | 300 yd (270 m)§ | | 82 |
| F2 | N of Whitley City to Laurel River Lake | McCreary, Whitley | KY | 36.80°N 84.43°W | April 3 | 01:30–01:45^{R} | 13 mi (21 km)† | —N/a | | 76 |
| F2§ | ESE of Estill Springs NW of Altamont§ | Franklin, Coffee, Grundy | TN | 35.26°N 86.04°W§ | April 3 | 01:40–02:02^{B} | 20 mi (32 km)§ | 100 yd (91 m)§ | Shamburger 2015 rated this as a F2 tornado. This tornado may have continued into Warren County as part of the 02:15 UTC Irving College–Spencer F3 tornado. | 99 |
| F4 | NE of Wilder to SE of Jamestown to SSW of Sharp Place§ | Fentress | TN | 36.28°N 85.09°W§ | April 3 | 01:41–01:57^{C} | 20 mi (32 km)§ | 200 yd (180 m)§ | At least six people were killed in Jamestown as the tornado destroyed portions of a mobile home park and neighboring residential neighborhood. Thirty-five homes were destroyed here. This was originally considered to be part of the 01:15 UTC Macedonia–Crawford F4 tornado. | 87 |
| F5 | N of Vernon to Guin, to Delmar, to ESE of Decatur | Lamar, Marion, Winston, Lawrence, Morgan | AL | 33.83°N 88.13°W | April 3 | 01:50–03:57¶^{B} | ≥79.5 mi (127.9 km)¶ | ≥1,760 yd (1,610 m)† | 28–30 deaths, 272–280 injuries — See article on this tornado – The Storm Data publication describes this event as "probably the most powerful tornado ever observed in Alabama." | 101 |
| F3† | Corbin to W of Fogertown | Laurel, Clay | KY | 36.97°N 84.12°W | April 3 | 01:55–02:20^{B} | 21 mi (34 km)† | —N/a | The NCEI database lists this as a F2 tornado. | 88 |
| F2† | NW of Erie | Monroe | MI | 41.80°N 83.52°W | April 3 | 01:56–01:57^{A} | 0.5 mi (0.80 km)† | 30 yd (27 m)† | 3 injuries — A brief tornado destroyed one home and damaged another. Three people were injured, one seriously. The NCEI database lists this as a F3 tornado. | 28 |
| F3 | Kidds Crossing to Ula | Wayne, Pulaski | KY | 36.78°N 84.70°W | April 3 | 02:00–02:35^{C} | 29 mi (47 km)† | —N/a | | 83 |
| F0+ | Dillard | Rabun | GA | 34.97°N 83.38°W | April 3 | 02:00–02:01^{C} | 0.5 mi (0.80 km)♭ | 20 yd (18 m)‡ | A brief tornado damaged homes, businesses, trees, and utilities in Dillard. Losses reached $90,000. The NCEI database lists it as a F2 tornado. Fujita rated this tornado as a F0 and Grazulis did not list it in his Significant Tornadoes book. | 131 |
| F3 | SSW of Irving College SSW of Spencer§ | Warren, Van Buren§ | TN | 35.26°N 86.04°W§ | April 3 | 02:04–02:22^{B} | 16 mi (26 km)§ | 200 yd (180 m)§ | This tornado may have been a continuation of the 02:00 UTC Estill Springs–Altamont F2 tornado. | 100 |
| F0 | London | Laurel | KY | —N/a | April 3 | 02:05–02:09^{R} | 3 mi (4.8 km) | —N/a | No information beyond the tornado's existence was found by the NWS Office in Jackson, Kentucky. This tornado was omitted from the NCEI database. | 77 |
| F0± | Frewsburg | Chatauqua | NY | 42.05°N 79.17°W | April 3 | 02:57–02:58^{A} | 0.25 mi (0.40 km) | 50 yd (46 m) | A brief tornado damaged the roofs of several buildings in a business district of Frewsburg. Trees were downed and a few windows were shattered. Fujita listed this as a F0 tornado while the NCEI database lists it as a F1. | 46 |
| F3 | SE of Decatur to southern Huntsville to E of Princeton | Morgan, Limestone, Madison, Jackson | AL | 34.53°N 86.90°W | April 3 | 03:29–04:27^{A} | 41 mi (66 km)† | 500 yd (460 m)† | 2 deaths, 7–50 injuries — See section on this tornado | 102 |
| F3 | Fawbush to Walnut Grove | Pulaski, Laurel, Rockcastle | KY | 37.03°N 84.40°W | April 3 | 03:35–04:05^{B} | 24 mi (39 km)† | —N/a | | 66 |
| F1 | NE of Pulaski to SW of Shelbyville | Giles, Marshall, Bedford | TN | 35.27°N 86.93°W§ | April 3 | 04:00–04:30^{D} | 28 mi (45 km)§ | 100 yd (91 m)§ | | 91 |
| F3 | Livingston to Monroe | Overton | TN | 36.36°N 85.36°W§ | April 3 | 04:30–04:45^{C} | 13 mi (21 km)§ | 400 yd (370 m)§ | | 85 |
| F1 | NW of Jessie to SE of Doyle | Warren, White | TN | 35.76°N 85.82°W | April 3 | 04:33–04:46^{B} | 20 mi (32 km)¶ | 100 yd (91 m)¶ | | 92 |
| F2† | SE of Black Oak to Oneida to Norma | Scott | TN | 36.48°N 84.60°W | April 3 | 04:48–05:01^{B} | 12 mi (19 km)† | 1,200 yd (1,100 m)¶# | The NCEI database lists this as a F3 tornado. | 89 |
| F2† | NE of Knoxville | Knox | TN | 36.10°N 83.77°W | April 3 | 05:30–05:35^{C} | 4 mi (6.4 km)† | 450 yd (410 m)¶# | The NCEI database lists this as a F1 tornado. | 107 |
| F3† | E of Sparta to Woody | White, Cumberland | TN | 35.94°N 85.33°W§ | April 3 | 05:30–06:00^{C} | 20 mi (32 km)§ | 900 yd (820 m)¶# | The NCEI database lists this as a F2 tornado. | 93 |
| F1¶ | Board Valley | White | TN | 36.05°N 85.36°W | April 3 | 05:30–06:00^{D} | 4 mi (6.4 km) | 100 yd (91 m) | This tornado was omitted from the NCEI database. | 90 |
| F3 | NE of Sunbright to Huntsville | Morgan, Scott | TN | 36.25°N 84.67°W | April 3 | 05:50–06:05^{C} | 12 mi (19 km)† | 1,050 yd (960 m)¶# | | 94 |
| F0 | W of Jefferson City | Jefferson | TN | 36.13°N 83.62°W | April 4 | 06:55–07:00^{C} | 4.5 mi (7.2 km)¶ | 80 yd (73 m)¶# | | 108 |
| F1 | Breaks Interstate Park | Dickenson | VA | 37.25°N 82.42°W | April 4 | 07:00–07:05^{D} | 7.3 mi (11.7 km)‡ | 17 yd (16 m)‡ | | 138 |
| F0 | Andersonville | Anderson, Union | TN | 36.20°N 84.07°W | April 4 | 07:20–07:30^{C} | 8.7 mi (14.0 km)¶ | 600 yd (550 m)¶# | | 106 |
| F0 | E of Jonesville | Lee | VA | 36.68°N 83.07°W | April 4 | 07:21‡ | 8.6 mi (13.8 km)¶ | 50 yd (46 m)¶♯ | | 143 |
| F0 | Rogersville | Hawkins | TN | 36.40°N 83.03°W | April 4 | 07:50–07:51^{D} | 0.5 mi (0.80 km)¶ | 80 yd (73 m)¶# | | 134 |
| F1 | W of Mullensville | Wyoming | WV | 37.57°N 81.45°W | April 4 | 08:00–08:10^{C} | 4.9 mi (7.9 km)‡ | —N/a | In Mullinsville, 15 homes were destroyed and 50 others suffered major damage; a mobilehome thrown into the Guyandotte River. Many trees were uprooted along the hillsides surrounding the town. Five to eight people were injured. | 139 |
| F1 | Gary | McDowell | WV | 37.38°N 81.55°W | April 4 | 08:00–08:01^{D} | —N/a | —N/a | Details on its impacts are unspecified. | 141 |
| F3 | W of Coal City to Shady Spring | Raleigh | WV | 37.67°N 81.27°W | April 4 | 08:14–08:28^{B} | 12 mi (19 km)† | 150 yd (140 m)† | Homes were destroyed south of Beckley; nine people were injured. Near the tornado's origin point, one trailer was destroyed in each of Coal City and Epperly. In Shady Spring, four homes and four trailers were destroyed and ten homes and three trailers were damaged. Damage in the county exceeded $1 million. | 140 |
| F3 | Channels State Forest to Saltville | Washington, Smyth | VA | 36.85°N 81.92°W | April 4 | 08:15–08:26^{B} | 9 mi (14 km)† | ≥530 yd (480 m)¶ | Width reached 530 yd (480 m) in Washington County but is unspecified in Smyth. One person was killed near Saltville when their mobile home was hurled over 100 yd (91 m); his wife was injured. | 144 |
| F0 | Leonardtown, TN, to Bristol, VA | Sullivan (TN), Bristol (City of, VA) | TN, VA | 36.52°N 82.50°W | April 4 | 08:20–08:50^{C} | 18.2 mi (29.3 km)‡ | 2,500 yd (2,300 m)‡ | 7 injuries — Four people were hospitalized in Sullivan County after their mobile homes were destroyed. In northern Bristol, an under-construction home had its entire second story destroyed. Several other homes lost their roof. The 280 ft (85 m) tall radio antenna of WZAP collapsed during the storm. Seven people were injured overall. Radar operators at the Tri-Cities Regional Airport did not report a tornadic signature. | 135 |
| F1 | Beckley | Raleigh | WV | 37.77°N 81.17°W | April 4 | 08:26–08:28^{B} | —N/a | —N/a | The NCEI database erroneously lists the tornado as occurring in Barbour County. | 136 |
| F3 | ENE of Beckley to Meadow Bridge to Friars Hill | Raleigh, Fayette, Greenbrier | WV | 37.80°N 81.02°W | April 4 | 08:30–09:10^{C} | 35 mi (56 km)† | ≥1,760 yd (1,610 m)♭# | 1 death, 21 injuries — The tornado moved through the New River Gorge National Park and Preserve where it traversed mountains up to 3,000 ft (910 m) and down 1,800 ft (550 m) into the valley gorges; This was the first clearly documented instance of a tornado traversing such mountainous terrain. The tornado's width fluctuated between 60 and 300 yd (55 and 274 m) in this area. Hardest-hit was Meadows Bridge where 10 homes were destroyed, 42 sustained major damage, and 38 had minor damage; 25 mobile homes were damaged. Multiple frame homes were demolished at near-F4 intensity; monetary reached $750,000. Many trees were snapped in half around Meadows Bridge. Aerial surveys showed two distinct damage paths that converged on Meadow Bridge; however, this was assessed as a single tornado with a maximum width in excess of 1 mi (1.6 km). One person was killed when their mobile home was tossed 75 yd (69 m). Four trailers were destroyed and one home had major damage in Rupert. Twenty-one people were injured. | 137 |
| F1± | Hinton | Summers | WV | 37.67°N 80.92°W | April 4 | 08:40–08:41^{B} | —N/a | —N/a | A six-story brick building had its roof torn off, rendering the top two floors a total loss; debris damaged a nearby bank. Windows were shattered at many businesses and trees were downed. Fujita rated this as a F1 tornado; however, the NCEI database lists it as a F0. | 142 |
| F2 | Roanoke | Roanoke, Roanoke (City of) | VA | 37.30°N 80.03°W | April 4 | 09:42–10:03^{A} | 9 mi (14 km)† | 1,760 yd (1,610 m)※# | The tornado touched down near VA 419 and the Lynchburg Turnpike where a trailer or pickup truck were blown across a road. It was initially very large, estimated at 1 mi (1.6 km) in width, and narrowed until its dissipation. A new building at an elementary school had its roof collapse. Approximately 120 homes, 2 apartment complexes, and 2 schools were damaged. All 18 structures at one of the complexes were damaged, some of which lost their roof. Homes under-construction in northeastern Roanoke County were knocked off their foundations. Many outbuildings and utility poles were destroyed. Total damage reached $400,000–500,000. The Red Cross prepared to open shelters and provide meals to displaced residents; they aided 125 people displaced from one of the apartment complexes. | 146 |
| F0 | SE of Blue Ridge | Fannin | GA | —N/a | April 4 | 10:00–10:01^{E} | 0.5 mi (0.80 km) | —N/a | This tornado was omitted from the NCEI database. | 125 |
| F1 | E of Swoop to Staunton to S of Weyers Cave | Augusta, Staunton (City of) | VA | 38.15°N 79.17°W | April 4 | 11:07–11:27^{C} | 15.2 mi (24.5 km)‡ | —N/a | This tornado occurred within a broader area of wind damage. Several barns were knocked over and highway signs were bent. A state trooper observing the tornado stated it was up to 0.5 mi (0.80 km) wide. Churchville suffered $15–20,000 in property damage. A 20 to 25 ft (6.1 to 7.6 m) section of roof was torn off of the Fort Defiance high school, leaving eight classrooms with water damage. Three homes suffered wall collapses in Staunton and the Augusta County Courthouse lost part of its roof. | 145 |
| F0 | Brasstown | Cherokee | NC | 35.03°N 83.97°W | April 4 | 13:00–13:01^{D} | 0.5 mi (0.80 km)♭ | —N/a | The NCEI database includes the funnel cloud aloft portion of this tornado as part of its track. | 129 |
| F1 | Morganton to NE of Drexel | Burke | NC | 35.75°N 81.70°W | April 4 | 13:30–13:35^{E} | 6.9 mi (11.1 km)‡ | —N/a | A tornado touched down in Morganton and damaged several structures. The NCEI database erroneously lists this tornado as occurring on April 3. | 147 |
| F2 | Hudson | Caldwell | NC | 35.82°N 81.53°W | April 4 | 13:45–13:50^{E} | 5 mi (8.0 km)† | —N/a | | 148 |
| F0 | Del Rio | Cocke | TN | 35.92°N 83.03°W | April 4 | 14:45–14:46^{D} | 0.5 mi (0.80 km)¶ | 80 yd (73 m)¶ | | 133 |

=== Other events ===
Multiple funnels were reported with the F5 Sayler Park tornado, two of which may have been distinct tornadoes. There is conflicting information on whether the damage from Waldron to Hudson, Michigan, was caused by one or two tornadoes. The Storm Data publication and NCEI database indicate two, nearly simultaneous F2 tornadoes originating near Waldron. However, Fujita and Grazulis list a single F2 tornado. The Storm Data publication lists a tornado that caused no damage north of Gibson City in Ford County, Illinois. This was not classified as a tornado by Fujita. Fujita initially analyzed a F0 tornado to the southwest of Cherry Log in Gilmer County, Georgia (Fujita tornado #122). This was later reclassified as a "tornado cyclone" rather than a true tornado. During the afternoon of April 4, two tornadoes touched down in southern Alabama. The Macon News listed that additional tornadoes were reported in Powder Springs, Douglasville, Austell, and Marietta. Although temporally close, they are not considered part of the Super Outbreak by Abbey and Fujita 1981 and Corfidi et al. 2010. The Richmond Times-Dispatch reported that a tornado caused damage to a horse farm and lumber yard in Kenbridge, Lunenburg County, Virginia, with a resident reporting a cone-shaped funnel. The two properties suffered $18,000 in damage.

== See also ==
- 1974 Super Outbreak
- 2011 Super Outbreak
- List of tornadoes in the 2011 Super Outbreak
- Tornadoes
- List of F5 and EF5 tornadoes
- List of tornadoes and tornado outbreaks
