= Aberdeen, Indiana =

Aberdeen, Indiana may refer to:

- Aberdeen, Ohio County, Indiana, an unincorporated community in Ohio County
- Aberdeen, Porter County, Indiana, a census-designated place in Porter County

== See also ==
- Aberdeen (disambiguation)
