= Adolph Hempel =

American entomologist

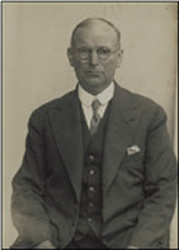

Adolph Hempel (10 April 1870 – 4 November 1949) was an American entomologist who worked and became a citizen in Brazil. He was involved in cataloguing the insects of the region and worked on agriculturally important insects and their management. He also took some interest in the birds.

Hempel was born in Buffalo, Ohio, and graduated from the University of Illinois, Urbana. He moved to Brazil in the late 1890s and began to work at the Museu Paulista. He also worked for the Campinas Agronomic Institute. He was involved in the identification of pest insects. In 1929 he introduced a wasp Prorops nasuta from Uganda to control the coffee berry borer Hypothenemus hampei. Hempel took a special interest in the Coccoidea and described numerous species. He retired in 1938, leaving behind an extensive collection. He published extensively covering a wide range of insect taxa. He also took some interest in other fauna and collected a number of bird specimens.
