= Cass Township, Indiana =

Cass Township is the name of eight townships in the U.S. state of Indiana:

- Cass Township, Clay County, Indiana
- Cass Township, Dubois County, Indiana
- Cass Township, Greene County, Indiana
- Cass Township, LaPorte County, Indiana
- Cass Township, Ohio County, Indiana
- Cass Township, Pulaski County, Indiana
- Cass Township, Sullivan County, Indiana
- Cass Township, White County, Indiana
