= Joseph Barricklow =

American lawyer, politician, and osteopath

Member of the Illinois House of Representatives
- In office 1895–1899

Personal details
- Born: Joseph P. Barricklow; February 7, 1867 Rising Sun, Indiana, U.S.
- Died: March 23, 1924 (aged 57) Daytona Beach, Florida, U.S.
- Party: Democratic
- Occupation: Politician, lawyer, osteopath

Joseph P. Barricklow (February 7, 1867 – March 23, 1924) was an American lawyer, politician, and osteopath.

Barricklow was born in Rising Sun, Indiana. In 1871, he moved with his parents to a farm in Arcola, Illinois. Barricklow went to the public schools and started to teach school in 1885. He studied law and was admitted to the Illinois bar in 1893. Barricklow joined the Illinois National Guard in 1885 and was commissioned a captain. Barricklow served in the Illinois House of Representatives from 1895 to 1899 and was a Democrat. Barricklow studied osteopathic medicine in St. Charles, Missouri, and then moved to Daytona Beach, Florida, where he practiced osteopathic medicine. He died in Daytona Beach after having surgery for appendicitis.
