= Norths Landing, Indiana =

- Unincorporated Community
- Location within Indiana Location within the United States
- Coordinates: 38°54′08″N 84°52′25″W
- Country: United States
- State: Indiana
- County: Ohio
- Township: Randolph
- Elevation: 472 ft (144 m)
- Time zone: UTC-6 (Eastern (EST))
  - Summer (DST): UTC-5 (EDT)
- ZIP code: 47040
- Area codes: 812, 930
- GNIS feature ID: 449841

Norths Landing is an unincorporated community in Randolph Township, Ohio County, in the U.S. state of Indiana.

== History ==
Norths Landing was laid out in 1831. The community was named for the North family of settlers.

A post office was established at Norths Landing in 1866, and remained in operation until it was discontinued in 1919.
