= Union Township, Ohio County, Indiana =

Union Township
- Township
- Location in Ohio County
- Coordinates: 38°59′16″N 84°58′01″W
- Country: United States
- State: Indiana
- County: Ohio

Government
  - Type: Indiana township

Area
  - Total: 11.61 sq mi (30.1 km^{2})
  - Land: 11.52 sq mi (29.8 km^{2})
  - Water: 0.09 sq mi (0.23 km^{2}) 0.78%
- Elevation: 620 ft (190 m)

Population (2020)
  - Total: 447
  - Density: 38.8/sq mi (15.0/km^{2})
- Time zone: UTC-5 (EST)
  - Summer (DST): UTC-4 (EDT)
- ZIP codes: 47001, 47018, 47040
- Area codes: 812, 930
- GNIS feature ID: 453927

Union Township is one of four townships in Ohio County, Indiana, United States. As of the 2020 census, its population was 447, and it contained 203 housing units.

Historical population
Census	Pop.	Note	%±
1890	533		—
1900	577		8.3%
1910	454		−21.3%
1920	392		−13.7%
1930	322		−17.9%
1940	267		−17.1%
1950	315		18.0%
1960	266		−15.6%
1970	249		−6.4%
1980	267		7.2%
1990	443		65.9%
2000	495		11.7%
2010	504		1.8%
2020	447		−11.3%
Source: US Decennial Census

== Geography ==
According to the 2010 census, the township has a total area of 11.61 square miles (30.1 km^{2}), of which 11.52 square miles (29.8 km^{2}) (or 99.22%) is land and 0.09 square miles (0.23 km^{2}) (or 0.78%) is water. Union is the smallest township in the state by area.

=== Unincorporated towns ===
- Hartford at 38.993114°N 84.956896°W
- Milton at 38.978392°N 85.014397°W

(This list is based on USGS data and may include former settlements.)

== School districts ==
- Rising Sun-Ohio County Community Schools

== Political districts ==
- State House District 68
- State Senate District 43
