= Milton, Ohio County, Indiana =

Milton
- Unincorporated Community
- Location within Indiana Location within the United States
- Coordinates: 38°58′42″N 85°00′52″W
- Country: United States
- State: Indiana
- County: Ohio
- Township: Union
- Elevation: 489 ft (149 m)
- Time zone: UTC-6 (Eastern (CST))
  - Summer (DST): UTC-5 (CDT)
- ZIP code: 47018
- Area codes: 812, 930
- GNIS feature ID: 439256

Milton is an unincorporated community in Union Township, Ohio County, in the U.S. state of Indiana.

== History ==
Pinkney James started a gristmill and sawmill at Milton in 1824. James laid out the community in 1825.

A post office was established at Milton in 1847, and remained in operation until it was discontinued in 1850.
