= Clore Plow Works-J.W. Whitlock and Company =

- U.S. National Register of Historic Places
- U.S. Historic district – Contributing property
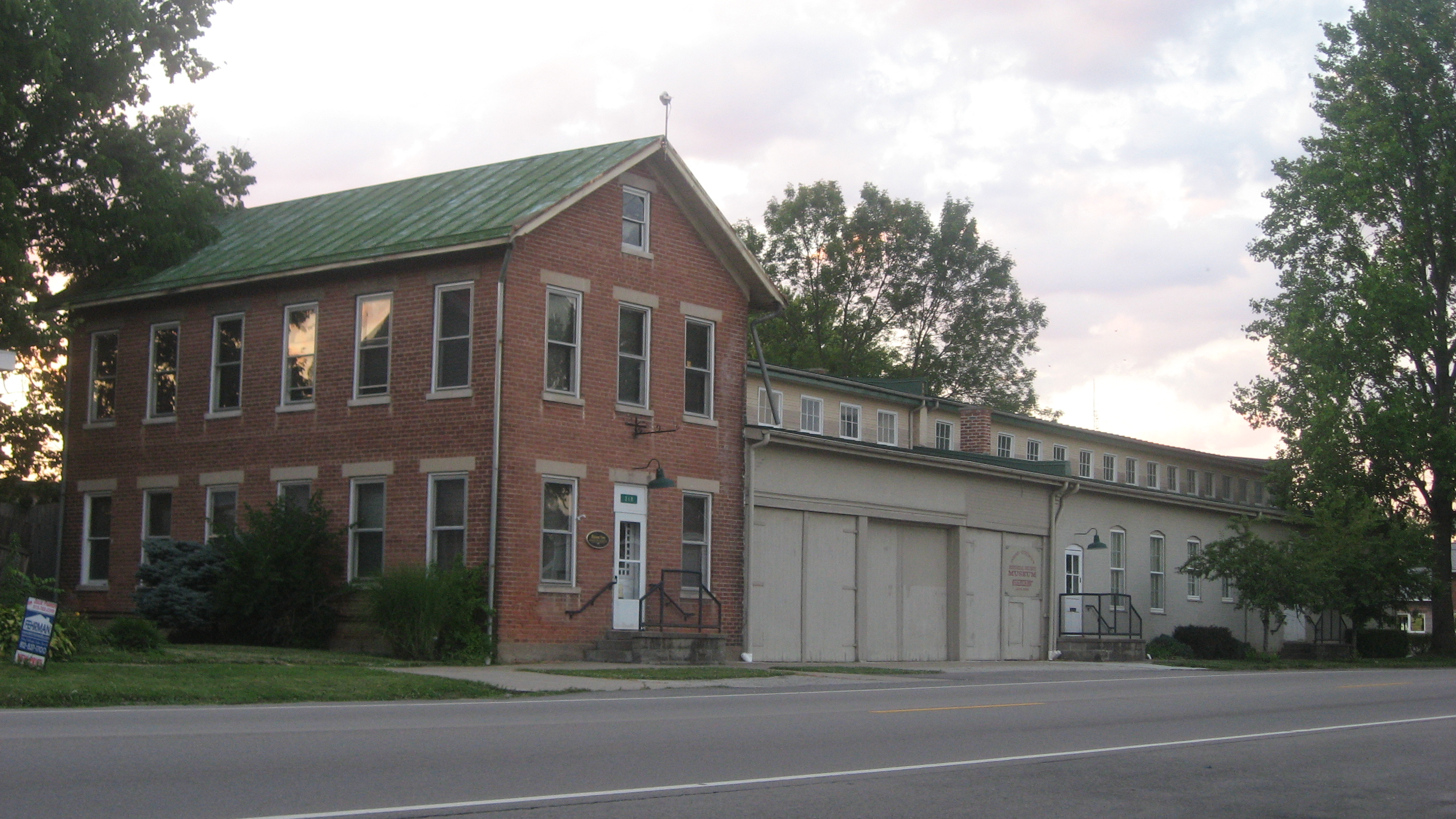
- Clore Plow Works-J.W. Whitlock and Company, June 2012

- Location within Indiana Location within the United States
- Location: 212 S. Walnut St., Rising Sun, Indiana
- Coordinates: 38°56′52″N 84°51′20″W
- Area: less than one acre
- Built: c. 1900, c. 1914
- NRHP reference No.: 99001152
- Added to NRHP: September 17, 1999

Clore Plow Works-J.W. Whitlock and Company are two historic industrial buildings located at Rising Sun, Indiana. The main building consists of six interconnected buildings: the Whitlock Office (c. 1914), Whitlock Garage (c. 1914), Clore Wood Shop (c. 1900), Clore Machine Shop (c. 1900), the Forge (c. 1900), and the Engine Room (c. 1900). Also on the property is the Paint Shed (c. 1900). The Ohio County Historical Society has occupied the buildings since 1969.

It was listed on the National Register of Historic Places in 1999. The buildings are located in the Rising Sun Historic District.
