= Rising Sun Historic District =

Historic district in Indiana, United States

- U.S. National Register of Historic Places
- U.S. Historic district
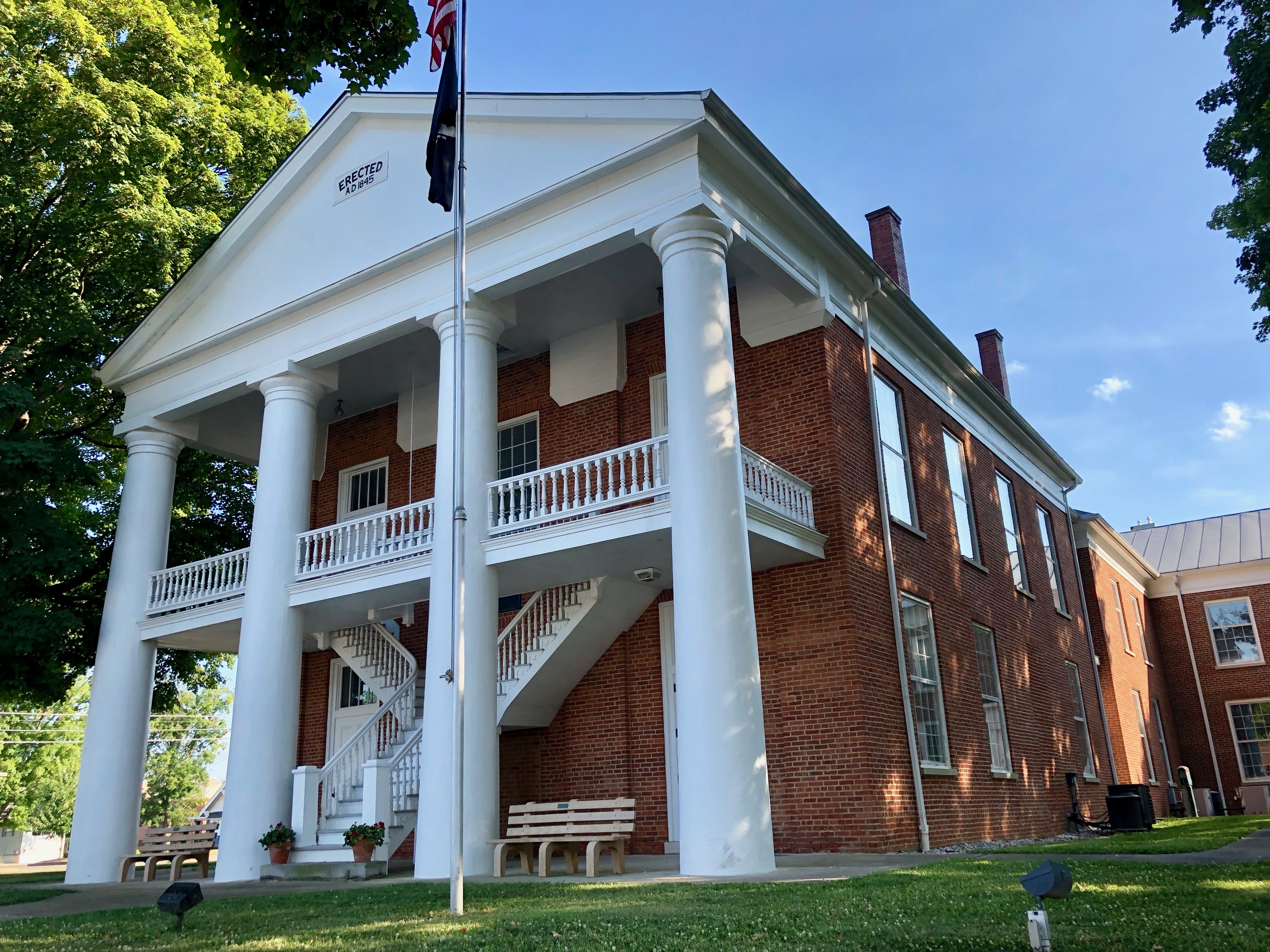
- Ohio County Courthouse, July 2019

- Location within Indiana Location within the United States
- Location: Roughly bounded by the Union and Soldier's Cemeteries, High St., Front St., and Maiden Ln., Rising Sun, Indiana
- Coordinates: 38°56′54″N 85°51′09″W
- Area: 148 acres (60 ha)
- Architectural style: Federal, Italianate
- NRHP reference No.: 06000935
- Added to NRHP: October 12, 2006

Rising Sun Historic District is a national historic district located at Rising Sun, Indiana. The district encompasses 322 contributing buildings, 2 contributing sites, and 2 contributing objects in Rising Sun. It developed between about 1810 and 1955, and includes notable examples of Federal, Italianate, and Classical Revival style architecture. Located in the district are the separately listed Clore Plow Works-J.W. Whitlock and Company buildings. Other notable contributing resources include the First Presbyterian Church (1843), Ohio County Courthouse (1845), Alexander C. Downey House (c. 1850), Rising Sun Cemetery (aka Union and Soldier's Cemeteries; c. 1810), and Robert E. Covington House (c. 1885).

It was listed on the National Register of Historic Places in 2006.
