= Center Township, Porter County, Indiana =

Center Township
- Township
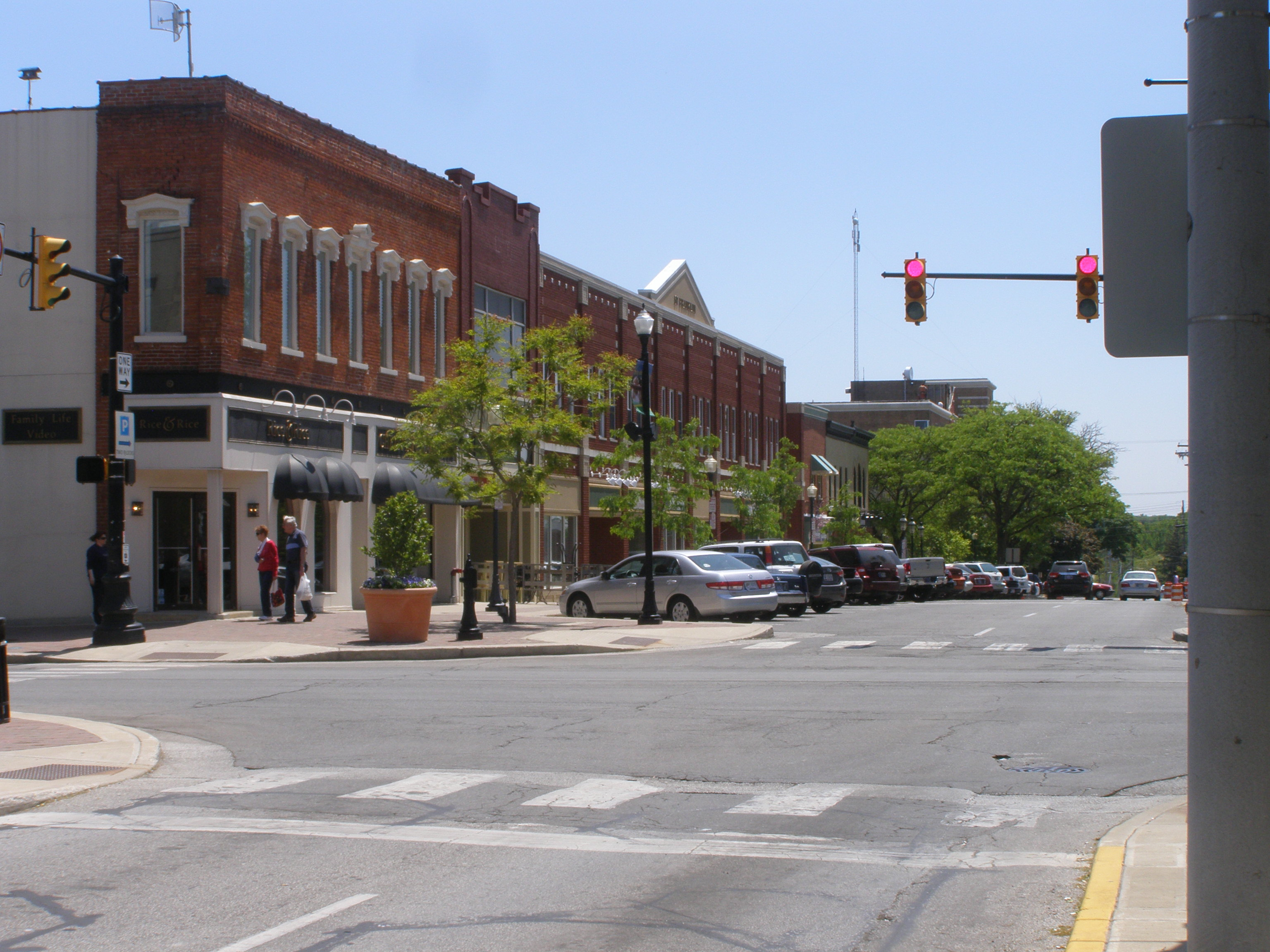
- Downtown Valparaiso, Indiana

- Coordinates: 41°28′39″N 87°04′29″W
- Country: United States
- State: Indiana
- County: Porter

Government
  - Type: Indiana township

Area
  - Total: 29.80 sq mi (77.19 km^{2})
  - Land: 29.39 sq mi (76.13 km^{2})
  - Water: 0.41 sq mi (1.06 km^{2})
- Elevation: 774 ft (236 m)

Population (2020)
  - Total: 46,272
  - Density: 1,472.0/sq mi (568.33/km^{2})
- Time zone: UTC-6 (Central (CST))
  - Summer (DST): UTC-5 (CDT)
- Area code: 219
- FIPS code: 18-11566
- GNIS feature ID: 453189
- Website: centertownshiptrustee.net

Center Township is one of twelve townships in Porter County, Indiana, United States. As of the 2010 census, its population was 43,267.

== History ==
Center Township was organized in 1836, and named for its location at the geographic center of Porter County.

== Cities and towns ==
The largest community in the township is Valparaiso. The Aberdeen CDP is also located in this township.

Historical population
Census	Pop.	Note	%±
1890	6,062		—
1900	7,222		19.1%
1910	7,971		10.4%
1920	7,422		−6.9%
1930	9,287		25.1%
1940	10,486		12.9%
1950	15,490		47.7%
1960	19,422		25.4%
1970	25,191		29.7%
1980	29,392		16.7%
1990	32,603		10.9%
2000	38,186		17.1%
2010	43,267		13.3%
2020	46,272		6.9%

== Education ==
Center Township is served by the Valparaiso Community Schools. Their high school is Valparaiso High School.

Valparaiso is also the home of Valparaiso University.
