= Randolph Township, Ohio County, Indiana =

Randolph Township
- Township
- Location in Ohio County
- Coordinates: 38°56′47″N 84°53′45″W
- Country: United States
- State: Indiana
- County: Ohio

Government
  - Type: Indiana township

Area
  - Total: 38.54 sq mi (99.8 km^{2})
  - Land: 37.34 sq mi (96.7 km^{2})
  - Water: 1.21 sq mi (3.1 km^{2}) 3.14%
- Elevation: 518 ft (158 m)

Population (2020)
  - Total: 4,307
  - Density: 115.3/sq mi (44.54/km^{2})
- Time zone: UTC-5 (EST)
  - Summer (DST): UTC-4 (EDT)
- ZIP codes: 47001, 47040
- Area codes: 812, 930
- GNIS feature ID: 453780

Randolph Township is one of four townships in Ohio County, Indiana, United States. As of the 2020 census, its population was 4,307 and it contained 2,008 housing units.

Historical population
Census	Pop.	Note	%±
1890	3,056		—
1900	2,984		−2.4%
1910	2,812		−5.8%
1920	2,649		−5.8%
1930	2,514		−5.1%
1940	2,628		4.5%
1950	3,044		15.8%
1960	3,173		4.2%
1970	3,418		7.7%
1980	4,034		18.0%
1990	4,023		−0.3%
2000	4,117		2.3%
2010	4,383		6.5%
2020	4,307		−1.7%
Source: US Decennial Census

== Geography ==
According to the 2010 census, the township has a total area of 38.54 square miles (99.8 km^{2}), of which 37.34 square miles (96.7 km^{2}) (or 96.89%) is land and 1.21 square miles (3.1 km^{2}) (or 3.14%) is water. The Ohio River defines the township's eastern border.

=== Cities, towns, villages ===
- Rising Sun

=== Unincorporated towns ===
- Buffalo at 39.020614°N 84.883839°W
- Norths Landing at 38.902283°N 84.873560°W

(This list is based on USGS data and may include former settlements.)

=== Cemeteries ===
The township contains these three cemeteries: Cedar Hedge, LaGrange and Rising Sun.

=== Major highways ===
- Indiana State Road 56
- Indiana State Road 262

== School districts ==
- Rising Sun-Ohio County Community Schools

== Political districts ==
- State House District 68
- State Senate District 43
