= Pike Township, Ohio County, Indiana =

Pike Township
- Township
- Location in Ohio County
- Coordinates: 38°56′01″N 85°04′57″W
- Country: United States
- State: Indiana
- County: Ohio
- Organized: 1845

Government
  - Type: Indiana township

Area
  - Total: 18.74 sq mi (48.5 km^{2})
  - Land: 18.74 sq mi (48.5 km^{2})
  - Water: 0 sq mi (0 km^{2}) 0%
- Elevation: 850 ft (260 m)

Population (2020)
  - Total: 492
  - Density: 26.3/sq mi (10.1/km^{2})
- Time zone: UTC-5 (EST)
  - Summer (DST): UTC-4 (EDT)
- ZIP codes: 47018, 47040
- Area codes: 812, 930
- GNIS feature ID: 453736

Pike Township is one of four townships in Ohio County, Indiana, United States. As of the 2020 census, its population was 492 and it contained 200 housing units.

Historical population
| Census | Pop. | Note | %± |
|---|---|---|---|
| 1890 | 665 | | — |
| 1900 | 548 | | −17.6% |
| 1910 | 472 | | −13.9% |
| 1920 | 448 | | −5.1% |
| 1930 | 388 | | −13.4% |
| 1940 | 367 | | −5.4% |
| 1950 | 358 | | −2.5% |
| 1960 | 279 | | −22.1% |
| 1970 | 224 | | −19.7% |
| 1980 | 332 | | 48.2% |
| 1990 | 303 | | −8.7% |
| 2000 | 362 | | 19.5% |
| 2010 | 527 | | 45.6% |
| 2020 | 492 | | −6.6% |
Source: US Decennial Census

== History ==
Pike Township was founded in 1845.

== Geography ==
According to the 2010 census, the township has a total area of 18.74 square miles (48.5 km^{2}), all land.

=== Unincorporated towns ===
- Bear Branch at 38.912837°N 85.074953°W

(This list is based on USGS data and may include former settlements.)

=== Cemeteries ===
The township contains four cemeteries: Bear Creek Cemeteries, Cooper, Pate and Saint Peters.

== School districts ==
- Rising Sun-Ohio County Community Schools

== Political districts ==
- State House District 68
- State Senate District 43
