= Thomas Victor Hall =

American artist (1879–1965)

- Born: May 30, 1879; Rising Sun, Indiana
- Died: 1965 (aged 85–86)
- Education: Cincinnati Art Academy

Thomas Victor Hall (T. Victor Hall; May 30, 1879 – 1965) was an American illustrator, painter and sculptor.

== Biography ==
Hall was born in Rising Sun, Indiana, 1879. He attended the Cincinnati Art Academy in the early 1900s where he studied with Frank Duveneck. Later he moved to Peekskill, New York and pursued a career as an illustrator. In 1919 he joined Louis C. Pedlar, Inc. Pedlar initiated the Art Director's Club in 1920. Hall's work appeared in many magazines and books of the day, including the St. Nicholas magazine, The Argosy and The Youth's Companion Magazine. Thomas Victor Hall's illustrations also appeared in All-Story Weekly, of which the most noteworthy is a series for Edgar Rice Burroughs' At The Earth's Core. .

Hall was well known as a war illustrator. Robert Rotter and T. Victor Hall illustrated a book, written by various authors, The Best 100 True Stories Of World War II, H. Wise & Co., Inc. 1945. He published his own book in 1934, Pitman Publishing Corporation titled First Steps in Pictorial Composition Hall continued to work and show in New York throughout the 20th century. He died in 1965.
