= 1976 United States presidential election in Indiana =

- November 2, 1976
- Turnout: 60.1% ▼0.7 pp

Nominee	Gerald Ford	Jimmy Carter
Party	Republican	Democratic
Home state	Michigan	Georgia
Running mate	Bob Dole	Walter Mondale
Electoral vote	13	0
Popular vote	1,183,958	1,014,714
Percentage	53.32%	45.70%
County results
Ford
40–50%
50–60%
60–70%
70–80%
Carter
50–60%
60–70%
President before election
Gerald Ford
Republican
Elected President
Jimmy Carter
Democratic

A presidential election was held in Indiana on November 2, 1976, as part of the 1976 United States presidential election. The Republican ticket of the incumbent president of the United States Gerald Ford and the junior U.S. senator from Kansas Bob Dole defeated the Democratic ticket of the former governor of Georgia Jimmy Carter and the junior U.S. senator from Minnesota Walter Mondale. Carter defeated Ford in the national election with 297 electoral votes.

Carter won the Democratic primary by a wide margin over his rivals. The closely-contested Republican primary saw the former governor of California Ronald Reagan defeat Ford in a narrow upset. Ford nevertheless went on to win his party's nomination at the 1976 Republican National Convention. Both major candidates campaigned in Indiana during the fall, with polls showing between 15 and 20 percent of the state's voters still undecided in the final weeks of the campaign. In the general election, Ford carried most of the counties comprising Northern and Central Indiana, while Carter did well in Southern Indiana counties in the Ohio Valley.

== Primary elections ==
=== Republican Party ===
Indiana Republican primary, May 4, 1976
Party	Candidate	Votes	%
Republican	Ronald Reagan	323,779	51.29
Republican	Gerald Ford	307,513	48.71
Total votes		631,292	100.00

=== Democratic Party ===
Indiana Democratic primary, May 4, 1976
Party	Candidate	Votes	%
Democratic	Jimmy Carter	417,480	67.95
Democratic	George Wallace	93,121	15.16
Democratic	Henry M. Jackson (withdrawn)	72,080	11.73
Democratic	Ellen McCormack	31,708	5.16
Total votes		614,389	100.00

== General election ==
=== Statistics ===
Carter carried Vigo County, Indiana, a national bellwether that supported the national winner in all but two presidential elections during the twentieth century. Carter's margin in Vigo County (2.3 percentage points) closely mirrored his national margin over Ford.

As of 2024, this is the most recent presidential election in which the Democratic ticket carried Dearborn, Dubois, Martin, Ohio, and Owen counties. This was the last election until 2024 in which St. Joseph County, Indiana, did not support the national popular vote winner.

=== Results ===
1976 United States presidential election in Indiana
Party	Candidate	Votes	%	±%
Republican	Gerald Ford Bob Dole	1,183,958	53.32	▼12.79
Democratic	Jimmy Carter Walter Mondale	1,014,714	45.70	▲12.36
American	Thomas J. Anderson Rufus Shackleford	14,048	0.63	▲0.63
Socialist Workers	Peter Camejo Willie Mae Reid	5,695	0.26	Steady
U.S. Labor	Lyndon LaRouche Ronald W. Evans	1,947	0.09	▲0.09
Total votes		2,220,362	100.00	

=== Results by county ===
1976 United States presidential election in Indiana by county
County	Gerald Ford Republican		Jimmy Carter Democratic		Others		Margin		Total
County	Votes	%	Votes	%	Votes	%	Votes	%	Total
Adams	6,280	55.55%	4,908	43.41%	118	1.04%	1,372	12.14%	11,306
Allen	71,321	60.56%	44,744	37.99%	1,704	1.45%	26,577	22.57%	117,769
Bartholomew	14,771	56.41%	11,203	42.78%	213	0.81%	3,568	13.63%	26,187
Benton	3,093	59.09%	2,071	39.57%	70	1.34%	1,022	19.52%	5,234
Blackford	2,886	47.16%	3,174	51.86%	60	0.98%	-288	-4.70%	6,120
Boone	9,214	61.48%	5,686	37.94%	86	0.57%	3,528	23.54%	14,986
Brown	2,466	50.29%	2,381	48.55%	57	1.16%	85	1.74%	4,904
Carroll	4,797	56.48%	3,606	42.46%	90	1.06%	1,191	14.02%	8,493
Cass	10,342	56.73%	7,610	41.74%	279	1.53%	2,732	14.99%	18,231
Clark	12,732	42.82%	16,670	56.07%	329	1.11%	-3,938	-13.25%	29,731
Clay	5,674	50.37%	5,433	48.23%	158	1.40%	241	2.14%	11,265
Clinton	8,199	54.80%	6,662	44.52%	102	0.68%	1,537	10.28%	14,963
Crawford	2,181	44.08%	2,721	54.99%	46	0.93%	-540	-10.91%	4,948
Daviess	6,829	57.69%	4,952	41.83%	57	0.48%	1,877	15.86%	11,838
Dearborn	6,176	49.04%	6,348	50.40%	71	0.56%	-172	-1.36%	12,595
Decatur	5,555	55.63%	4,365	43.72%	65	0.65%	1,190	11.91%	9,985
DeKalb	7,860	55.17%	6,151	43.18%	235	1.65%	1,709	11.99%	14,246
Delaware	26,417	50.72%	25,151	48.29%	519	1.00%	1,266	2.43%	52,087
Dubois	6,383	45.97%	7,385	53.19%	116	0.84%	-1,002	-7.22%	13,884
Elkhart	27,291	60.07%	17,581	38.70%	557	1.23%	9,710	21.37%	45,429
Fayette	5,704	50.53%	5,519	48.89%	65	0.58%	185	1.64%	11,288
Floyd	11,259	46.42%	12,744	52.54%	252	1.04%	-1,485	-6.12%	24,255
Fountain	4,903	54.16%	4,089	45.17%	60	0.66%	814	8.99%	9,052
Franklin	3,557	51.96%	3,234	47.25%	54	0.79%	323	4.71%	6,845
Fulton	5,083	58.41%	3,488	40.08%	132	1.52%	1,595	18.33%	8,703
Gibson	7,105	45.55%	8,430	54.04%	64	0.41%	-1,325	-8.49%	15,599
Grant	16,847	55.14%	13,468	44.08%	239	0.78%	3,379	11.06%	30,554
Greene	6,442	46.54%	7,263	52.47%	138	1.00%	-821	-5.93%	13,843
Hamilton	21,828	72.86%	7,857	26.23%	273	0.91%	13,971	46.63%	29,958
Hancock	10,072	61.31%	6,191	37.69%	164	1.00%	3,881	23.62%	16,427
Harrison	4,911	45.90%	5,685	53.14%	103	0.96%	-774	-7.24%	10,699
Hendricks	16,725	64.07%	9,066	34.73%	313	1.20%	7,659	29.34%	26,104
Henry	11,620	53.19%	10,137	46.40%	91	0.42%	1,483	6.79%	21,848
Howard	19,571	56.48%	14,815	42.75%	267	0.77%	4,756	13.73%	34,653
Huntington	9,182	57.78%	6,515	41.00%	193	1.21%	2,667	16.78%	15,890
Jackson	7,615	49.58%	7,610	49.55%	133	0.87%	5	0.03%	15,358
Jasper	5,398	60.76%	3,286	36.99%	200	2.25%	2,112	23.77%	8,884
Jay	4,606	52.24%	4,124	46.77%	87	0.99%	482	5.47%	8,817
Jefferson	5,573	46.94%	6,139	51.71%	161	1.36%	-566	-4.77%	11,873
Jennings	4,505	49.99%	4,430	49.16%	77	0.85%	75	0.83%	9,012
Johnson	16,414	61.36%	10,075	37.66%	260	0.97%	6,339	23.70%	26,749
Knox	9,100	48.25%	9,612	50.97%	148	0.78%	-512	-2.72%	18,860
Kosciusko	14,505	65.56%	7,328	33.12%	291	1.32%	7,177	32.44%	22,124
LaGrange	3,876	57.24%	2,835	41.86%	61	0.90%	1,041	15.38%	6,772
Lake	90,119	42.36%	120,700	56.74%	1,922	0.90%	-30,581	-14.38%	212,741
LaPorte	21,989	54.09%	18,217	44.81%	449	1.10%	3,772	9.28%	40,655
Lawrence	9,278	53.20%	7,908	45.34%	254	1.46%	1,370	7.86%	17,440
Madison	32,437	51.63%	29,811	47.45%	572	0.91%	2,626	4.18%	62,820
Marion	177,767	54.60%	145,274	44.62%	2,535	0.78%	32,493	9.98%	325,576
Marshall	9,707	59.16%	6,424	39.15%	277	1.69%	3,283	20.01%	16,408
Martin	2,702	48.55%	2,827	50.80%	36	0.65%	-125	-2.25%	5,565
Miami	8,263	54.52%	6,257	41.29%	635	4.19%	2,006	13.23%	15,155
Monroe	18,938	53.06%	16,609	46.53%	148	0.41%	2,329	6.53%	35,695
Montgomery	9,509	63.01%	5,320	35.25%	263	1.74%	4,189	27.76%	15,092
Morgan	10,983	59.99%	7,181	39.22%	145	0.79%	3,802	20.77%	18,309
Newton	3,204	58.44%	2,236	40.78%	43	0.78%	968	17.66%	5,483
Noble	6,885	52.91%	5,875	45.15%	253	1.94%	1,010	7.76%	13,013
Ohio	1,027	43.95%	1,300	55.63%	10	0.43%	-273	-11.68%	2,337
Orange	4,399	51.90%	4,031	47.56%	46	0.54%	368	4.34%	8,476
Owen	2,896	47.83%	3,103	51.25%	56	0.92%	-207	-3.42%	6,055
Parke	3,929	55.00%	3,158	44.20%	57	0.80%	771	10.80%	7,144
Perry	4,088	41.95%	5,620	57.66%	38	0.39%	-1,532	-15.71%	9,746
Pike	3,138	44.19%	3,938	55.46%	25	0.35%	-800	-11.27%	7,101
Porter	25,489	59.75%	16,468	38.60%	701	1.64%	9,021	21.15%	42,658
Posey	5,136	48.97%	5,298	50.51%	54	0.51%	-162	-1.54%	10,488
Pulaski	3,586	54.21%	2,813	42.52%	216	3.27%	773	11.69%	6,615
Putnam	6,063	53.67%	5,116	45.29%	118	1.04%	947	8.38%	11,297
Randolph	6,891	55.93%	5,330	43.26%	99	0.80%	1,561	12.67%	12,320
Ripley	5,293	52.11%	4,792	47.18%	72	0.71%	501	4.93%	10,157
Rush	4,723	60.32%	3,052	38.98%	55	0.70%	1,671	21.34%	7,830
Scott	2,657	38.14%	4,229	60.71%	80	1.15%	-1,572	-22.57%	6,966
Shelby	8,918	55.22%	7,098	43.95%	134	0.83%	1,820	11.27%	16,150
Spencer	4,166	46.34%	4,796	53.35%	28	0.31%	-630	-7.01%	8,990
St. Joseph	50,358	50.20%	49,156	49.00%	810	0.81%	1,202	1.20%	100,324
Starke	4,354	47.12%	4,753	51.43%	134	1.45%	-399	-4.31%	9,241
Steuben	5,079	59.23%	3,323	38.75%	173	2.02%	1,756	20.48%	8,575
Sullivan	3,747	41.61%	5,198	57.72%	61	0.68%	-1,451	-16.11%	9,006
Switzerland	1,329	38.07%	2,150	61.59%	12	0.34%	-821	-23.52%	3,491
Tippecanoe	29,186	61.33%	17,850	37.51%	551	1.16%	11,336	23.82%	47,587
Tipton	4,776	57.35%	3,428	41.16%	124	1.49%	1,348	16.19%	8,328
Union	1,631	58.25%	1,160	41.43%	9	0.32%	471	16.82%	2,800
Vanderburgh	37,975	51.87%	34,911	47.69%	325	0.44%	3,064	4.18%	73,211
Vermillion	3,674	43.03%	4,791	56.11%	73	0.86%	-1,117	-13.08%	8,538
Vigo	23,555	48.46%	24,684	50.78%	371	0.76%	-1,129	-2.32%	48,610
Wabash	8,534	59.51%	5,704	39.78%	102	0.71%	2,830	19.73%	14,340
Warren	2,377	55.13%	1,906	44.20%	29	0.67%	471	10.93%	4,312
Warrick	7,200	47.69%	7,804	51.70%	92	0.61%	-604	-4.01%	15,096
Washington	3,794	45.61%	4,409	53.01%	115	1.38%	-615	-7.40%	8,318
Wayne	16,697	57.20%	12,306	42.16%	188	0.64%	4,391	15.04%	29,191
Wells	5,596	56.33%	4,250	42.78%	88	0.89%	1,346	13.55%	9,934
White	6,287	60.63%	3,963	38.22%	119	1.15%	2,324	22.41%	10,369
Whitley	6,761	54.34%	5,445	43.77%	235	1.89%	1,316	10.57%	12,441
TOTAL	1,183,958	53.32%	1,014,714	45.70%	21,690	0.98%	169,244	7.62%	2,220,362

==== Counties that flipped from Republican to Democratic ====
- Blackford
- Clark
- Crawford
- Dearborn
- Dubois
- Floyd
- Gibson
- Greene
- Harrison
- Jefferson
- Knox
- Lake
- Martin
- Ohio
- Owen
- Posey
- Perry
- Pike
- Scott
- Switzerland
- Spencer
- Starke
- Sullivan
- Vermillion
- Vigo
- Warrick
- Washington

=== Results by congressional district ===
1976 United States presidential election in Indiana by congressional district
District	Ford	Carter	Representative
1st	38.7%	61.3%	Adam Benjamin Jr.
2nd	61.4%	38.6%	Floyd Fithian
3rd	53.9%	46.1%	John Brademas
4th	59.7%	40.3%	Dan Quayle
5th	57.2%	42.8%	Elwood Hillis
6th	58.5%	41.5%	David W. Evans
7th	52.6%	47.4%	John T. Myers
8th	49.9%	50.1%	David L. Cornwell
9th	49.0%	51.0%	Lee H. Hamilton
10th	55.0%	45.0%	Philip Sharp
11th	54.6%	45.4%	Andrew Jacobs Jr.

== Hillary Rodham's involvement ==
Hillary Rodham (m. Clinton) was a state organizer for the Carter campaign in Indiana. She subsequently served as first lady of the United States from 1993 to 2001, as U.S. senator from New York from 2001 to 2009, and as U.S. secretary of state from 2009 to 2013. Carter would recall Clinton's time as a campaign worker in Indiana during a speech supporting her candidacy in the 2016 United States presidential election. "During my 1976 presidential run, a young woman moved to Indianapolis to help turn out the Indiana vote for me," he said. "Forty years later, I will proudly cast my vote for that same woman to be the next President of the United States."

== See also ==
- United States presidential elections in Indiana

== Bibliography ==
- Congressional Quarterly (1985). Congressional Quarterly's Guide to U.S. Elections (2nd ed.). Washington D.C.: Congressional Quarterly.
- Conrad, Larry A. (1976). 1976 Election Report State of Indiana. Indianapolis: Indiana Secretary of State.
- Madison, James H. (1986). The Indiana Way: A State History. Bloomington: Indiana University Press.
- McGillivray, Alice V.; Scammon, Richard M. (1994). America at the Polls, 1960–1992: Kennedy to Clinton; A Handbook of American Presidential Election Statistics. Washington, D.C.: Congressional Quarterly.
- Menendez, Albert J. (2009). The Geography of Presidential Elections in the United States, 1868–2004. Jefferson, NC: McFarland and Company.
- Park-Egan, Kiernan (n.d.). "1976 Presidential General Election Results, Results by Congressional District". Atlas of U.S. Presidential Election Results.
- Stoner, Andrew E. (2017). Campaign Crossroads: Presidential Politics in Indiana from Lincoln to Obama. Indianapolis: Indiana Historical Society Press.
- Sullivan, Robert David (June 29, 2016). "How the Red and Blue Map Evolved over the Past Century". America.
