= Hartford, Ohio County, Indiana =

Hartford
- Unincorporated Community
- Location within Indiana Location within the United States
- Coordinates: 38°59′35″N 84°57′25″W
- Country: United States
- State: Indiana
- County: Ohio
- Township: Union
- Elevation: 509 ft (155 m)
- Time zone: UTC-6 (Eastern (CST))
  - Summer (DST): UTC-5 (CDT)
- ZIP code: 47001
- Area codes: 812, 930
- GNIS feature ID: 435824

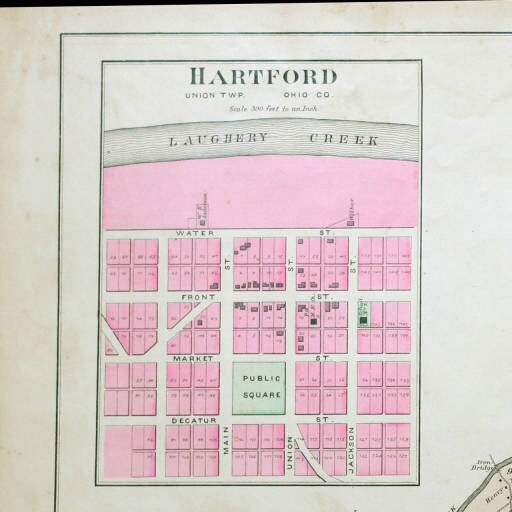
Old Hartford before the flood

Hartford is an unincorporated community in Union Township, Ohio County, in the U.S. state of Indiana.

== History ==
Hartford was laid out about 1817. In its peak years, Hartford was a point on the stagecoach route from Madison to Aurora. Before the flood of 1937 there were four mills, and a general store which opened up in 1978 and closed in the mid-1980s.

A post office was established at Hartford in 1844, and remained in operation until it was discontinued in 1891.

== Geography ==
Laughery Creek lies to the north of the community.
