= Kidds Crossing, Kentucky =

Unincorporated community in Kentucky, United States

- Unincorporated community
- Location within Kentucky Location within the United States
- Coordinates: 36°45′23″N 84°40′48″W
- Country: United States
- State: Kentucky
- County: Wayne
- Elevation: 896 ft (273 m)
- Time zone: UTC-5 (Eastern (EST))
  - Summer (DST): UTC-4 (EDT)
- Area code: 606
- GNIS feature ID: 508388

Kidds Crossing is an unincorporated community in Wayne County, Kentucky, United States. The community is on Kentucky Route 92 near the McCreary County border, 10.7 miles (17.2 km) east-southeast of Monticello.
