= Friars Hill, West Virginia =

Unincorporated community in West Virginia, United States

- Unincorporated community
- Location within West Virginia Location within the United States
- Coordinates: 38°00′51″N 80°26′21″W
- Country: United States
- State: West Virginia
- County: Greenbrier
- Elevation: 2,352 ft (717 m)
- Time zone: UTC-5 (Eastern (EST))
  - Summer (DST): UTC-4 (EDT)
- Area codes: 304 & 681
- GNIS feature ID: 1554512

Friars Hill is an unincorporated community in Greenbrier County, West Virginia, United States. Friars Hill is 6 miles (9.7 km) west-northwest of Falling Spring.

The community was named after one Mr. Friar, a pioneer who settled upon a hill.
