= Rising Sun, Indiana =

- City
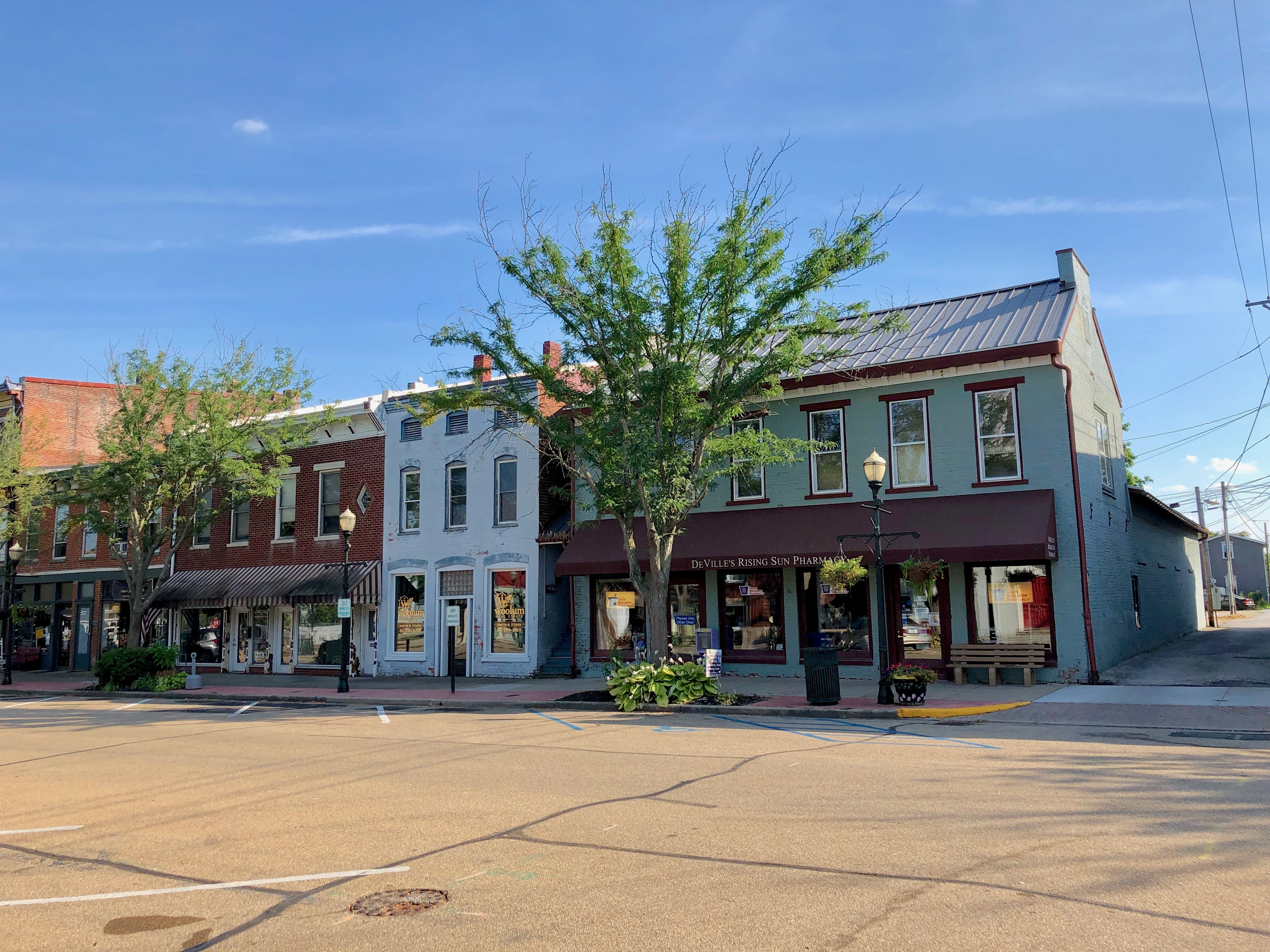
- Main Street in Downtown Rising Sun

- Logo

- Location of Rising Sun in Ohio County, Indiana.

- Location within Indiana Location within the United States
- Coordinates: 38°57′11″N 84°51′16″W
- Country: United States
- State: Indiana
- County: Ohio
- Township: Randolph

Government
  - Mayor: Steve Slack (R)

Area
  - Total: 1.63 sq mi (4.23 km^{2})
  - Land: 1.50 sq mi (3.89 km^{2})
  - Water: 0.13 sq mi (0.34 km^{2}) 7.64%
- Elevation: 509 ft (155 m)

Population (2020)
  - Total: 2,248
  - Density: 1,496.5/sq mi (577.81/km^{2})
- Time zone: UTC-5 (EST)
  - Summer (DST): UTC-4 (EDT)
- ZIP code: 47040
- Area code: 812
- FIPS code: 18-64674
- GNIS feature ID: 2396381
- Website: www.cityofrisingsun.com

Rising Sun is a city in Randolph Township and the county seat of Ohio County, Indiana, United States, along the Ohio River. It is also the only incorporated community in the county. The population of Rising Sun was 2,248 at the 2020 census.

== History ==
The town was registered in 1816 by John James, originally of Frederick County, Maryland. At the time, it had a population of about 700. Many German immigrants settled in Rising Sun. The Rising Sun post office has been in operation since 1844.

In the 1830s, Rising Sun was a seasonal stop for hundreds of flatboats daily heading down the Ohio River.

The Clore Plow Works-J.W. Whitlock and Company and Rising Sun Historic District are listed on the National Register of Historic Places.

== Geography ==
According to the 2010 census, Rising Sun has a total area of 1.569 square miles (4.06 km^{2}), of which 1.45 square miles (3.76 km^{2}) (or 92.42%) is land and 0.119 square miles (0.31 km^{2}) (or 7.58%) is water.

== Demographics ==
Historical population
Census	Pop.	Note	%±
1850	1,674		—
1860	1,733		3.5%
1870	1,760		1.6%
1880	1,806		2.6%
1890	1,689		−6.5%
1900	1,548		−8.3%
1910	1,513		−2.3%
1920	1,411		−6.7%
1930	1,379		−2.3%
1940	1,545		12.0%
1950	1,930		24.9%
1960	2,230		15.5%
1970	2,305		3.4%
1980	2,478		7.5%
1990	2,311		−6.7%
2000	2,470		6.9%
2010	2,304		−6.7%
2020	2,248		−2.4%
U.S. Decennial Census

=== 2020 census ===
As of the 2020 census, Rising Sun had a population of 2,248. The median age was 45.6 years. 20.4% of residents were under the age of 18 and 24.7% of residents were 65 years of age or older. For every 100 females there were 92.8 males, and for every 100 females age 18 and over there were 89.6 males age 18 and over.

0.0% of residents lived in urban areas, while 100.0% lived in rural areas.

There were 1,022 households in Rising Sun, of which 24.8% had children under the age of 18 living in them. Of all households, 37.7% were married-couple households, 21.7% were households with a male householder and no spouse or partner present, and 32.4% were households with a female householder and no spouse or partner present. About 39.1% of all households were made up of individuals and 21.5% had someone living alone who was 65 years of age or older.

There were 1,118 housing units, of which 8.6% were vacant. The homeowner vacancy rate was 2.3% and the rental vacancy rate was 3.7%.

Racial composition as of the 2020 census
Race	Number	Percent
White	2,125	94.5%
Black or African American	12	0.5%
American Indian and Alaska Native	2	0.1%
Asian	21	0.9%
Native Hawaiian and Other Pacific Islander	0	0.0%
Some other race	8	0.4%
Two or more races	80	3.6%
Hispanic or Latino (of any race)	30	1.3%

=== 2010 census ===
As of the census of 2010, there were 2,304 people, 1,004 households, and 591 families living in the city. The population density was 1,589.0 inhabitants per square mile (613.5/km^{2}). There were 1,124 housing units at an average density of 775.2 per square mile (299.3/km^{2}). The racial makeup of the city was 97.8% White, 0.7% African American, 0.1% Native American, 0.4% Asian, 0.4% from other races, and 0.6% from two or more races. Hispanic or Latino of any race were 1.8% of the population.

There were 1,004 households, of which 26.0% had children under the age of 18 living with them, 41.2% were married couples living together, 12.5% had a female householder with no husband present, 5.2% had a male householder with no wife present, and 41.1% were non-families. 36.7% of all households were made up of individuals, and 16.9% had someone living alone who was 65 years of age or older. The average household size was 2.24 and the average family size was 2.90.

The median age in the city was 43.9 years. 19.6% of residents were under the age of 18; 9.5% were between the ages of 18 and 24; 22.1% were from 25 to 44; 29.1% were from 45 to 64; and 19.8% were 65 years of age or older. The gender makeup of the city was 47.7% male and 52.3% female.

=== 2000 census ===
As of the census of 2000, there were 2,470 people, 1,034 households, and 645 families living in the city. The population density was 1,664.4 inhabitants per square mile (642.6/km^{2}). There were 1,119 housing units at an average density of 754.0 per square mile (291.1/km^{2}). The racial makeup of the city was 98.02% White, 0.97% African American, 0.24% Native American, 0.16% Asian, 0.04% Pacific Islander, 0.04% from other races, and 0.53% from two or more races. Hispanic or Latino of any race were 0.73% of the population.

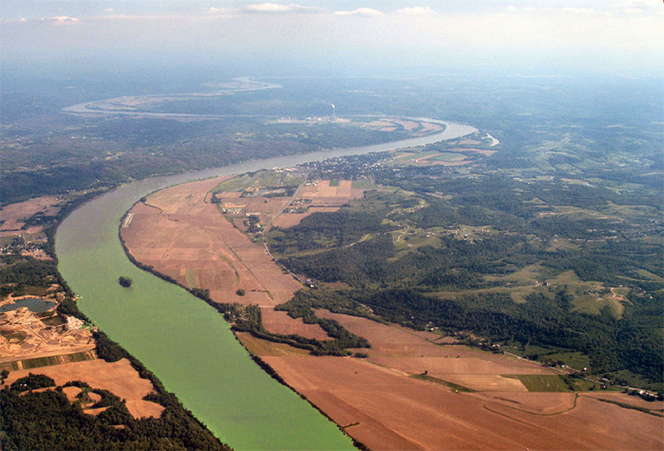
Rising Sun, on the Ohio River.

There were 1,034 households, out of which 29.0% had children under the age of 18 living with them, 48.0% were married couples living together, 10.8% had a female householder with no husband present, and 37.6% were non-families. 32.2% of all households were made up of individuals, and 15.5% had someone living alone who was 65 years of age or older. The average household size was 2.34 and the average family size was 3.00.

In the city, the population was spread out, with 24.0% under the age of 18, 9.4% from 18 to 24, 27.4% from 25 to 44, 21.1% from 45 to 64, and 18.1% who were 65 years of age or older. The median age was 38 years. For every 100 females, there were 89.9 males. For every 100 females age 18 and over, there were 86.1 males.

The median income for a household in the city was $33,750, and the median income for a family was $46,731. Males had a median income of $35,213 versus $23,438 for females. The per capita income for the city was $17,221. 10.3% of the population and 7.0% of families were below the poverty line. Out of the total people living in poverty, 12.1% are under the age of 18 and 15.1% are 65 or older.

== Economy ==
The Rising Star Casino Resort (formerly known as Grand Victoria Casino & Resort) was opened in October 1996 by an affiliate of Hyatt Corporation with a 2,700-passenger riverboat and 40,000 square feet of gaming space.

== Education ==
The town has a lending library, the Ohio County Public Library.

== Notable people ==
- Joseph Barricklow, lawyer and state legislator
- Michael Callen, singer, songwriter, author, and AIDS activist
- Alexander Downey, judge
- George Eddy Downey, attorney, mayor and judge
- Thomas Victor Hall, illustrator, painter and sculptor
- Abel C. Pepper, politician, law enforcement officer, and Indian agent

== See also ==
- List of cities and towns along the Ohio River
- Blue Jeans (play) - popular play in 1890s and later a film, is set in Rising Sun.
