= Ohio County, Indiana =

County in Indiana, United States

- County
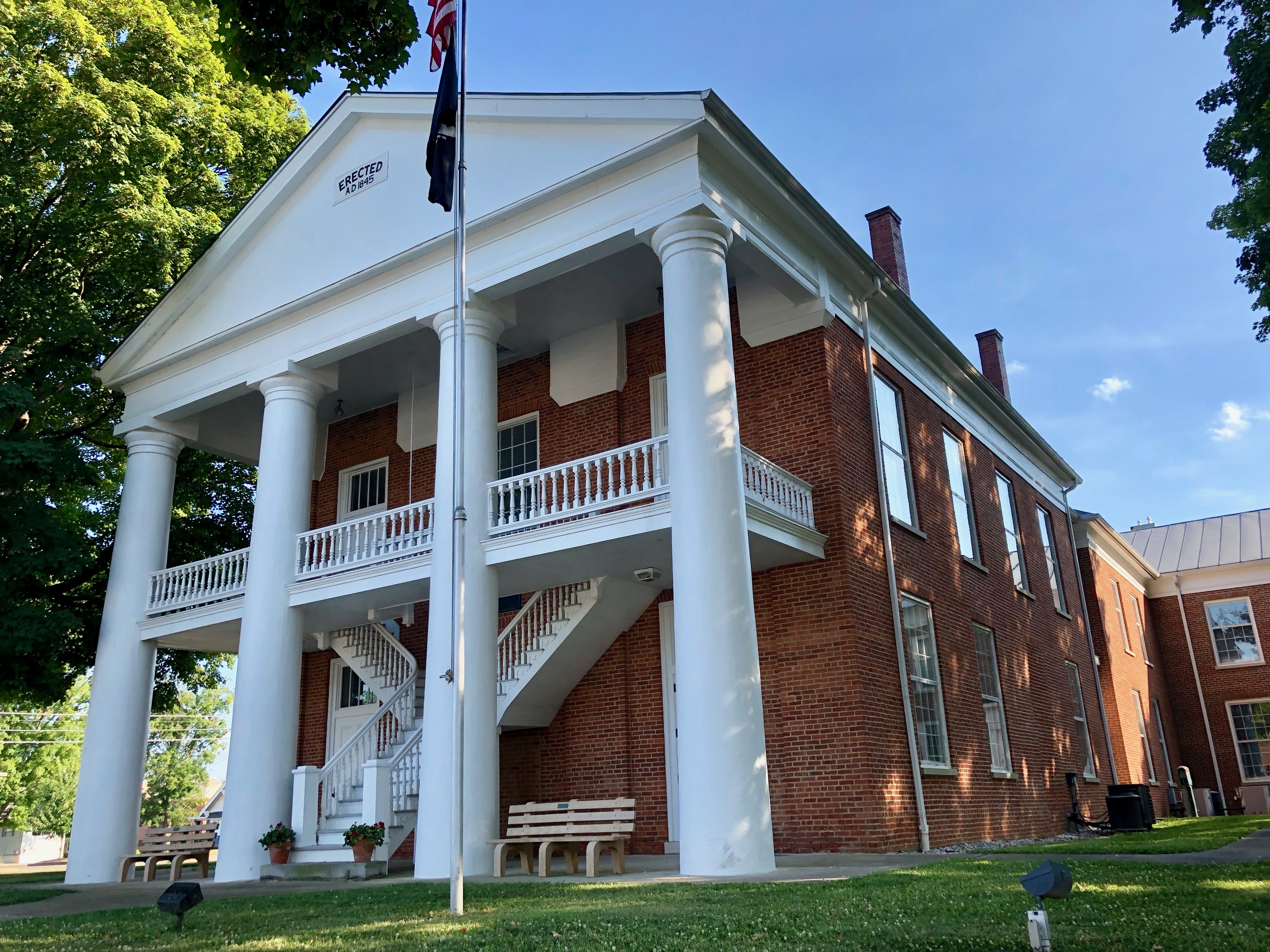
- Ohio County Courthouse in Rising Sun

- Logo

- Location within the U.S. state of Indiana
- Coordinates: 38°57′N 84°58′W
- Country: United States
- State: Indiana
- Founded: 1844
- Named for: Ohio River
- Seat: Rising Sun
- Largest city: Rising Sun

Area
  - Total: 87.43 sq mi (226.4 km^{2})
  - Land: 86.14 sq mi (223.1 km^{2})
  - Water: 1.29 sq mi (3.3 km^{2}) 1.48%

Population (2020)
  - Total: 5,940
  - Estimate (2025): 5,994 ▲
  - Density: 69.0/sq mi (26.6/km^{2})
- Time zone: UTC−5 (Eastern)
  - Summer (DST): UTC−4 (EDT)
- Congressional district: 6th
- Website: ohiocountyin.gov
- Indiana county number 58; FIPS County Code 115; Smallest county in Indiana in area Least populated county in Indiana

Ohio County is a county located in southeastern Indiana. With a 2020 population of 5,940, and an area of just 87 square miles, Ohio County is the smallest county in Indiana by area and the least populous. The county seat and only incorporated municipality is Rising Sun. The county was officially established in 1844 and was one of the last Indiana counties to be created. Ohio County borders the state of Kentucky across the Ohio River for which it was named. It is part of the Cincinnati, OH-KY-IN Metropolitan Statistical Area. The county is divided into four townships which provide local services. Three state roads pass through or into the county.

== History ==
Dearborn County was formed from Indiana Territory in 1803, and its borders were modified several times, both before and after the creation of the state of Indiana in 1816. Ohio County was created out of Dearborn County, authorized by legislative action effective January 4, 1844, to resolve a dispute of county seat between Rising Sun and Lawrenceburg. It was named for the Ohio River, which defines its eastern border.

The Ohio County courthouse was built in the county seat of Rising Sun in 1845. It is a two-story Greek Revival brick building measuring about 60 feet (18 m) by 40 feet (12 m), including the portico supported by Doric pillars. This courthouse is still in use and is the oldest continuously used courthouse in the state.

== Geography ==
Map of Ohio County, showing townships and settlements

According to the 2010 census, the county has a total area of 87.43 square miles (226.4 km^{2}), of which 86.14 square miles (223.1 km^{2}) (or 98.52%) is land and 1.29 square miles (3.3 km^{2}) (or 1.48%) is water.

=== Adjacent counties ===
- Boone County, Kentucky – east
- Dearborn County – north
- Ripley County – northwest
- Switzerland County – south

=== Communities ===
==== Incorporated communities ====
- Rising Sun – on the banks of the Ohio River

==== Unincorporated communities ====
- Aberdeen
- Bascom Corner
- Bear Branch
- Blue
- Buffalo
- Camp Shore
- Cofield Corner
- Downey Corner
- Hartford
- Milton
- Norths Landing
- Pate

=== Townships ===
- Cass
- Pike
- Randolph
- Union

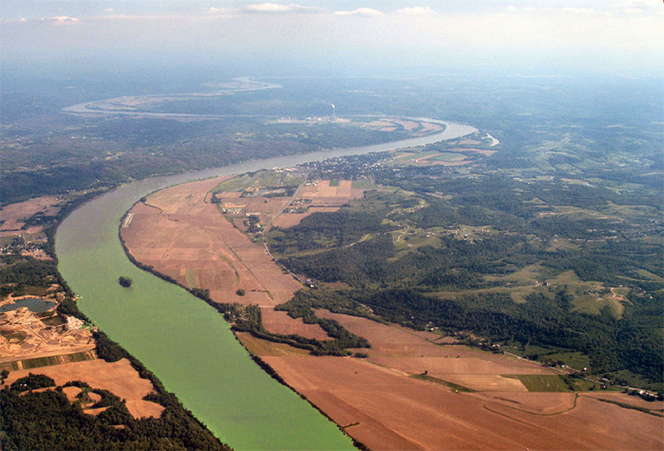
Rising Sun, on the Ohio River.

== Transportation ==
=== Highways ===
- US Route 50 in Dearborn County passes within 2 miles (3.2 km) of Ohio County's northern border.
- State Road 56 enters from Switzerland County to the south and passes east along the southern border, then north through Rising Sun and along the river, continuing north to Dearborn county.
- State Road 156 runs along the Ohio River in Switzerland County, and enters the far southeast part of Ohio County, continuing NW and north to its intersection with State Road 56, 1.5 miles inside Ohio County.
- State Road 262 enters from Dillsboro and crosses the county in a general eastern direction, ending in Rising Sun.

=== Railroads ===
There are no active railroad lines in the county.

== Education ==
Ohio County has two schools managed by a single school corporation. The Ohio County Elementary–Middle School served a total of 636 students during the 2009–2010 school year. Rising Sun High School served a total of 264 students during the same period.

Ohio County residents are served by the Ohio County Public Library with a single branch in Rising Sun.

== Climate and weather ==
Rising Sun, Indiana

Climate chart (precipitation, max. and min. temperature)
J	F	M	A	M	J	J	A	S	O	N	D
3.1 39 21	3 45 24	4.1 55 32	4.2 66 41	4.7 75 51	4.8 83 60	3.9 87 65	3.8 86 63	3.1 79 56	2.9 68 43	3.5 56 35	3.4 44 26
- █ Average max. and min. temperatures in °F
- █ Precipitation totals in inches
- Source: The Weather Channel
Metric conversion
J	F	M	A	M	J	J	A	S	O	N	D
78 4 −6	75 7 −4	104 13 0	107 19 5	120 24 11	123 28 16	100 31 18	97 30 17	78 26 13	74 20 6	88 13 2	87 7 −3
- █ Average max. and min. temperatures in °C
- █ Precipitation totals in mm

In recent years, average temperatures in Rising Sun have ranged from a low of 21 °F (−6 °C) in January to a high of 87 °F (31 °C) in July, although a record low of −23 °F (−31 °C) was recorded in January 1994 and a record high of 104 °F (40 °C) was recorded in July 1988. Average monthly precipitation ranged from 2.92 inches (74 mm) in October to 4.83 inches (123 mm) in June.

== Government ==
The county government is a constitutional body granted specific powers by the Constitution of Indiana and the Indiana Code. The county council is the legislative branch of the county government and controls all spending and revenue collection. Representatives are elected from county districts. The council members serve four-year terms and are responsible for setting salaries, the annual budget and special spending. The council also has limited authority to impose local taxes, in the form of an income and property tax that is subject to state level approval, excise taxes and service taxes.

A board of commissioners serves as the county's executive body. The commissioners are elected county–wide to staggered four–year terms. One commissioner serves as board president. The board executes the acts legislated by the council, collects revenue, and manages day-to-day functions of the county government.

The county maintains a small claims court that can handle some civil cases. The judge on the court is elected to a term of four years and must be a member of the Indiana Bar Association. The judge is assisted by a constable who is elected to a four-year term. In some cases, court decisions can be appealed to the state level circuit court which is shared with neighboring Dearborn County.

The county has several other elected offices, including sheriff, coroner, auditor, treasurer, recorder, surveyor and circuit court clerk; they are elected to four–year terms. Members elected to county government positions are required to declare party affiliations and be residents of the county.

Each of the townships has a trustee who administers rural fire protection and ambulance service, provides poor relief and manages cemetery care, among other duties. The trustee is assisted in these duties by a three-member township board. The trustees and board members are elected to four-year terms.

Ohio County is part of Indiana's 9th congressional district; Indiana Senate district 43; and Indiana House of Representatives district 68.

United States presidential election results for Ohio County, Indiana
Year	Republican		Democratic		Third party(ies)	
Year	No.	%	No.	%	No.	%
1888	726	55.25%	585	44.52%	3	0.23%
1892	662	51.72%	606	47.34%	12	0.94%
1896	705	52.61%	634	47.31%	1	0.07%
1900	730	53.25%	632	46.10%	9	0.66%
1904	962	60.66%	584	36.82%	40	2.52%
1908	619	49.13%	622	49.37%	19	1.51%
1912	406	36.02%	553	49.07%	168	14.91%
1916	597	47.46%	632	50.24%	29	2.31%
1920	1,177	50.91%	1,097	47.45%	38	1.64%
1924	989	46.98%	1,058	50.26%	58	2.76%
1928	1,230	57.10%	911	42.29%	13	0.60%
1932	997	43.25%	1,288	55.88%	20	0.87%
1936	1,022	42.87%	1,362	57.13%	0	0.00%
1940	1,186	49.33%	1,210	50.33%	8	0.33%
1944	1,126	51.56%	1,043	47.76%	15	0.69%
1948	1,031	46.55%	1,173	52.96%	11	0.50%
1952	1,219	51.92%	1,119	47.66%	10	0.43%
1956	1,237	53.07%	1,087	46.63%	7	0.30%
1960	1,314	56.25%	1,015	43.45%	7	0.30%
1964	905	39.21%	1,397	60.53%	6	0.26%
1968	1,053	46.04%	991	43.33%	243	10.63%
1972	1,368	59.50%	922	40.10%	9	0.39%
1976	1,027	43.95%	1,300	55.63%	10	0.43%
1980	1,264	52.23%	1,074	44.38%	82	3.39%
1984	1,503	58.32%	1,068	41.44%	6	0.23%
1988	1,412	55.79%	1,113	43.97%	6	0.24%
1992	1,009	40.14%	970	38.58%	535	21.28%
1996	1,098	44.38%	1,083	43.78%	293	11.84%
2000	1,515	60.79%	951	38.16%	26	1.04%
2004	1,796	60.72%	1,139	38.51%	23	0.78%
2008	1,713	58.70%	1,158	39.68%	47	1.61%
2012	1,759	62.40%	994	35.26%	66	2.34%
2016	2,118	72.51%	686	23.49%	117	4.01%
2020	2,392	75.60%	750	23.70%	22	0.70%
2024	2,381	77.03%	666	21.55%	44	1.42%

== Demographics ==
Historical population
Census	Pop.	Note	%±
1850	5,308		—
1860	5,462		2.9%
1870	5,837		6.9%
1880	5,563		−4.7%
1890	4,955		−10.9%
1900	4,724		−4.7%
1910	4,329		−8.4%
1920	4,024		−7.0%
1930	3,747		−6.9%
1940	3,782		0.9%
1950	4,223		11.7%
1960	4,165		−1.4%
1970	4,289		3.0%
1980	5,114		19.2%
1990	5,315		3.9%
2000	5,623		5.8%
2010	6,128		9.0%
2020	5,940		−3.1%
2025 (est.)	5,994	▲	0.9%
U.S. Decennial Census; 1790-1960 1900-1990; 1990-2000 2010-2017

=== Racial and ethnic composition ===
Ohio County, Indiana – Racial and ethnic composition Note: the US Census treats Hispanic/Latino as an ethnic category. This table excludes Latinos from the racial categories and assigns them to a separate category. Hispanics/Latinos may be of any race.
Race / Ethnicity (NH = Non-Hispanic)	Pop 1980	Pop 1990	Pop 2000	Pop 2010	Pop 2020	% 1980	% 1990	% 2000	% 2010	% 2020
White alone (NH)	5,039	5,250	5,531	5,967	5,629	98.53%	98.78%	98.36%	97.37%	94.76%
Black or African American alone (NH)	48	41	27	21	16	0.94%	0.77%	0.48%	0.34%	0.27%
Native American or Alaska Native alone (NH)	2	8	6	11	4	0.04%	0.15%	0.11%	0.18%	0.07%
Asian alone (NH)	8	9	8	19	29	0.16%	0.17%	0.14%	0.31%	0.49%
Native Hawaiian or Pacific Islander alone (NH)	x	x	1	0	0	x	x	0.02%	0.00%	0.00%
Other race alone (NH)	3	0	0	3	16	0.06%	0.00%	0.00%	0.05%	0.27%
Mixed race or Multiracial (NH)	x	x	25	38	167	x	x	0.44%	0.62%	2.81%
Hispanic or Latino (any race)	14	7	25	69	79	0.27%	0.13%	0.44%	1.13%	1.33%
Total	5,114	5,315	5,623	6,128	5,940	100.00%	100.00%	100.00%	100.00%	100.00%

=== 2020 census ===
As of the 2020 census, the county had a population of 5,940. The median age was 47.2 years. 20.5% of residents were under the age of 18 and 22.0% of residents were 65 years of age or older. For every 100 females there were 98.1 males, and for every 100 females age 18 and over there were 97.6 males age 18 and over.

The racial makeup of the county was 95.2% White, 0.3% Black or African American, 0.1% American Indian and Alaska Native, 0.5% Asian, <0.1% Native Hawaiian and Pacific Islander, 0.4% from some other race, and 3.6% from two or more races. Hispanic or Latino residents of any race comprised 1.3% of the population.

<0.1% of residents lived in urban areas, while 100.0% lived in rural areas.

There were 2,476 households in the county, of which 27.8% had children under the age of 18 living in them. Of all households, 51.6% were married-couple households, 18.0% were households with a male householder and no spouse or partner present, and 23.4% were households with a female householder and no spouse or partner present. About 28.0% of all households were made up of individuals and 14.4% had someone living alone who was 65 years of age or older.

There were 2,722 housing units, of which 9.0% were vacant. Among occupied housing units, 76.3% were owner-occupied and 23.7% were renter-occupied. The homeowner vacancy rate was 1.9% and the rental vacancy rate was 2.9%.

=== 2010 census ===
As of the 2010 United States census, there were 6,128 people, 2,477 households, and 1,737 families residing in the county. The population density was 71.1 inhabitants per square mile (27.5/km^{2}). There were 2,784 housing units at an average density of 32.3 per square mile (12.5/km^{2}). The racial makeup of the county was 98.1% white, 0.4% black or African American, 0.3% Asian, 0.2% American Indian, 0.3% from other races, and 0.7% from two or more races. Those of Hispanic or Latino origin made up 1.1% of the population. In terms of ancestry, 33.5% were German, 12.6% were Irish, 12.2% were American, and 7.3% were English.

Of the 2,477 households, 28.7% had children under the age of 18 living with them, 56.2% were married couples living together, 9.8% had a female householder with no husband present, 29.9% were non-families, and 25.2% of all households were made up of individuals. The average household size was 2.45 and the average family size was 2.91. The median age was 43.7 years.

The median income for a household in the county was $47,697 and the median income for a family was $64,271. Males had a median income of $49,241 versus $30,536 for females. The per capita income for the county was $25,703. About 5.5% of families and 8.4% of the population were below the poverty line, including 11.4% of those under age 18 and 8.6% of those age 65 or over.

== See also ==
- National Register of Historic Places listings in Ohio County, Indiana
