= Buffalo, Ohio County, Indiana =

Buffalo
- Unincorporated Community
- Location within Indiana Location within the United States
- Coordinates: 39°01′14″N 84°53′02″W
- Country: United States
- State: Indiana
- County: Ohio
- Township: Randolph
- Elevation: 486 ft (148 m)
- Time zone: UTC-6 (Eastern (CST))
  - Summer (DST): UTC-5 (CDT)
- ZIP code: 47001
- Area codes: 812, 930
- GNIS feature ID: 431769

Buffalo (also known as French) is an unincorporated community in Randolph Township, Ohio County, in the U.S. state of Indiana.

== History ==
The post office which once operated in Buffalo was called French. This post office opened in 1897, and was discontinued in 1905.
