= Lees Lick, Kentucky =

Unincorporated community in Kentucky, United States

Coordinates: 38°20′09″N 84°25′07″W

Lees Lick is an unincorporated community in Harrison County, Kentucky, in the United States.

== History ==
Lees Lick was described in 1877 as a small settlement which contained only one store. A post office was established as Leeslick in 1888, and remained in operation until it was discontinued in 1901.
