= Cass Township, Ohio County, Indiana =

Cass Township
- Township
- Location in Ohio County
- Coordinates: 38°55′53″N 84°59′22″W
- Country: United States
- State: Indiana
- County: Ohio
- Organized: 1845

Government
  - Type: Indiana township

Area
  - Total: 18.54 sq mi (48.0 km^{2})
  - Land: 18.54 sq mi (48.0 km^{2})
  - Water: 0 sq mi (0 km^{2}) 0%
- Elevation: 830 ft (253 m)

Population (2020)
  - Total: 694
  - Density: 37.4/sq mi (14.5/km^{2})
- Time zone: UTC-5 (EST)
  - Summer (DST): UTC-4 (EDT)
- ZIP codes: 47018, 47040
- Area codes: 812, 930
- GNIS feature ID: 453166

Cass Township is one of four townships in Ohio County, Indiana, United States. As of the 2020 census, its population was 694 and it contained 311 housing units.

Historical population
Census	Pop.	Note	%±
1890	701		—
1900	615		−12.3%
1910	591		−3.9%
1920	535		−9.5%
1930	523		−2.2%
1940	520		−0.6%
1950	506		−2.7%
1960	447		−11.7%
1970	398		−11.0%
1980	481		20.9%
1990	546		13.5%
2000	649		18.9%
2010	714		10.0%
2020	694		−2.8%
Source: US Decennial Census

== History ==
Cass Township was organized in 1845.

== Geography ==
According to the 2010 census, the township has a total area of 18.54 square miles (48.0 km^{2}), all land.

=== Unincorporated towns ===
- Aberdeen at 38.905338°N 84.987451°W
- Bascom Corner at 38.908650°N 84.968494°W
- Blue at 38.925099°N 85.004856°W
- Cofield Corner at 38.952837°N 84.958562°W
- Downey Corner at 38.938624°N 85.010226°W
- Pate at 38.952761°N 84.973848°W

(This list is based on USGS data and may include former settlements.)

=== Cemeteries ===
The township contains Downey Cemetery.

=== Major highways ===
- Indiana State Road 56

== School districts ==
- Rising Sun-Ohio County Community Schools

== Political districts ==
- State House District 68
- State Senate District 43
