= Aberdeen, Ohio County, Indiana =

Unincorporated community in Indiana, United States

- Unincorporated Community
- Location within Indiana Location within the United States
- Coordinates: 38°54′19″N 84°59′15″W
- Country: United States
- State: Indiana
- County: Ohio
- Township: Cass
- Elevation: 883 ft (269 m)
- Time zone: UTC-6 (Eastern (CST))
  - Summer (DST): UTC-5 (CDT)
- ZIP code: 47040
- Area codes: 812, 930
- FIPS code: 18/00136
- GNIS feature ID: 429985

Aberdeen is an unincorporated community and Census-designated place in Cass Township, Ohio County, in the U.S. state of Indiana.

== History ==
The first settlement at Aberdeen was made in about 1814. It was named after Aberdeen, in Scotland.

A post office was established at Aberdeen in 1852, and remained in operation until it was discontinued in 1880.

== Geography ==
Aberdeen is located off of Indiana State Road 56 at the intersection of Aberdeen Rd. and Cass-Union Rd.
