= Bear Branch, Indiana =

- Unincorporated Community
- Location within Indiana Location within the United States
- Coordinates: 38°54′46″N 85°04′30″W
- Country: United States
- State: Indiana
- County: Ohio
- Township: Pike
- Elevation: 869 ft (265 m)
- Time zone: UTC-6 (Eastern (EST))
  - Summer (DST): UTC-5 (CDT)
- ZIP code: 47018
- Area codes: 812, 930
- GNIS feature ID: 449617

Bear Branch is an unincorporated community in Pike Township, Ohio County, in the U.S. state of Indiana.

== History ==
Bear Branch was founded in 1845. A post office was established at Bear Branch in 1849, and remained in operation until it was discontinued in 1937.
