= Aberdeen, Porter County, Indiana =

- Census-designated place
- Location of Aberdeen in Porter County, Indiana.
- Coordinates: 41°26′30″N 87°07′16″W
- Country: United States
- State: Indiana
- Counties: Porter
- Township: Center

Area
  - Total: 1.26 sq mi (3.26 km^{2})
  - Land: 1.26 sq mi (3.26 km^{2})
  - Water: 0 sq mi (0.00 km^{2})
- Elevation: 768 ft (234 m)

Population (2020)
  - Total: 2,117
  - Density: 1,683.6/sq mi (650.05/km^{2})
- Time zone: UTC-6 (Central (CST))
  - Summer (DST): UTC-5 (CDT)
- ZIP code: 46385
- Area code: 219
- FIPS code: 18-00140
- GNIS feature ID: 2629862

Aberdeen is a census-designated place (CDP) in Center Township, Porter County, in the U.S. state of Indiana. The community centers on The Course at Aberdeen, a golf course. The population of the CDP was 2,117 as of the 2020 census, up from 1,875 in the 2010 census.

== Geography ==
Aberdeen is located southwest of Valparaiso, the county seat.

According to the United States Census Bureau, the CDP has a total area of 1.3 square miles (3.3 km^{2}), all land.

== Demographics ==
Historical population
Census	Pop.	Note	%±
2010	1,875		—
2020	2,117		12.9%
U.S. Decennial Census
