= Hollencamp House =

Historic house in Ohio, United States

- U.S. National Register of Historic Places
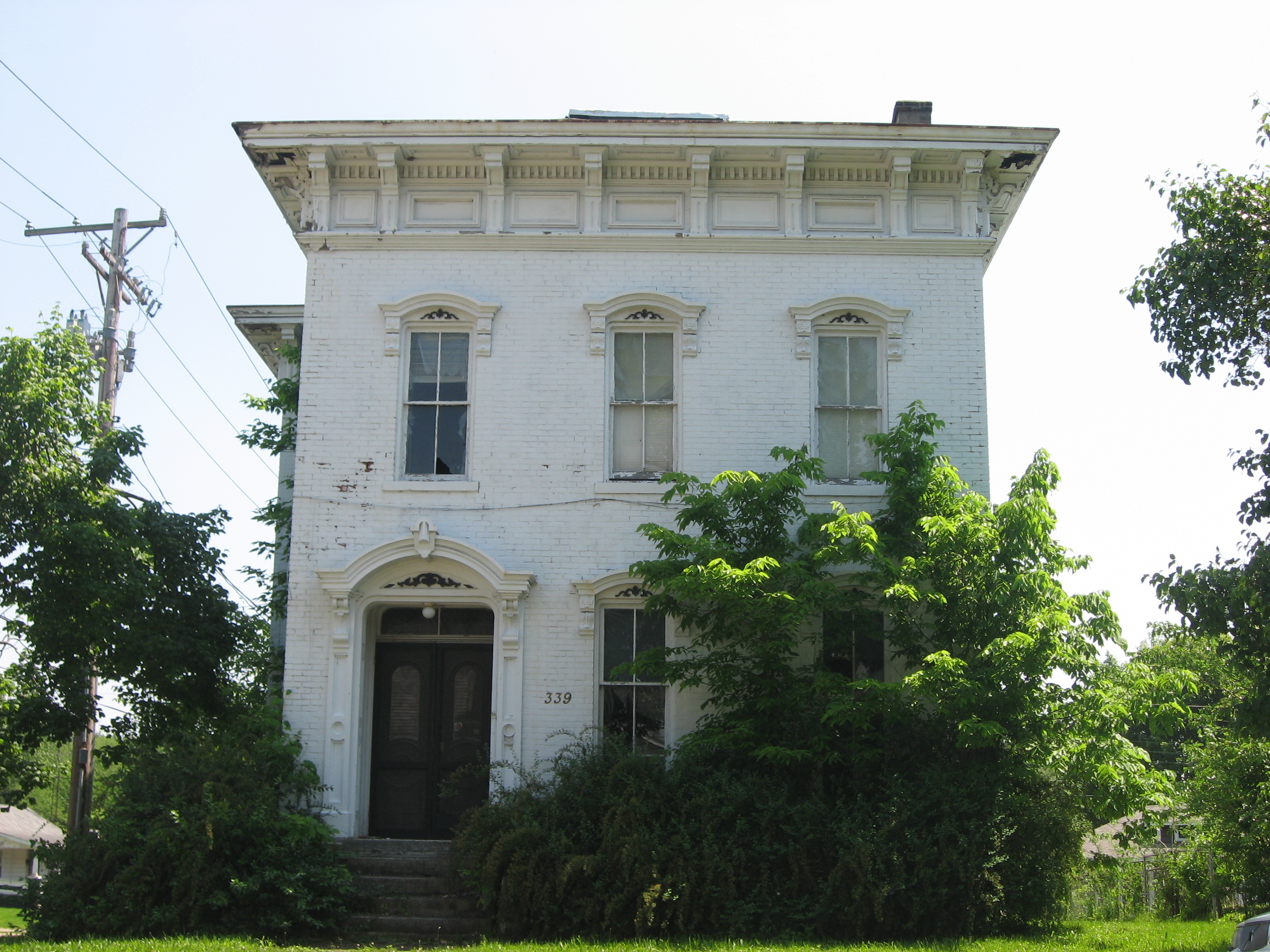
- Front of the house

- Location within Ohio Location within the United States
- Location: 339 E. 2nd St., Xenia, Ohio
- Coordinates: 39°41′3″N 83°55′24″W
- Area: 0.2 acres (0.081 ha)
- Built: 1871
- Architect: Samuel Patterson
- Architectural style: Italianate
- NRHP reference No.: 80003029
- Added to NRHP: July 18, 1980

The Hollencamp House is a historic residence in the city of Xenia, Ohio, United States. Constructed as the home of a prominent immigrant businessman, it has been named a historic site.

Born in Germany, Bernard Hollencamp settled in Xenia, where he began operating the Hollencamp Brewery on Second Street east of the city's downtown. In later years, the brewery property was converted for three different uses: a creamery, an ice house, and a bottling company occupied the site.

Hollencamp arranged for the construction of the present house in 1871 on a lot adjacent to his brewery. Designed by Samuel Patterson, an architect who was also responsible for the design of the Samuel N. Patterson House elsewhere in the city, the Hollencamp House is a brick Italianate building with a stone foundation, an asphalt roof, and elements of stone. Two stories tall with painted bricks laid in American bond, the house has an asymmetrical floor plan. The interior is divided into thirteen rooms — six of which feature fireplaces with wooden mantels — as well as four bathrooms. Comparatively few components of the house have changed since its original construction.

In 1980, the Hollencamp House was listed on the National Register of Historic Places, qualifying because of its historically important architecture and because of its place as the home of a locally significant individual. Although it is the only building on East Second individually listed on the National Register, it lies near a Register-listed historic district, the East Second Street Historic District. The district and the Hollencamp House are historically significant as a well-preserved nineteenth-century streetscape and as surviving examples of residences for the city's wealthy during a period in the late nineteenth century when Victorian architectural styles were highly popular.
