= The Fierce Dispute =

Book by Helen Hooven Santmyer

- 1987 edition
- Author: Helen Hooven Santmyer
- Language: English
- Genre: Gothic, psychological, family saga
- Publisher: Houghton Mifflin
- Publication date: 1929
- Publication place: United States
- Media type: Print (Hardcover)
- Pages: 208 pp (1st edition, hardcover)

The Fierce Dispute is a 1929 novel by Helen Hooven Santmyer. Her second novel, it is set around 1900 in an unnamed town in Ohio (later acknowledged by Santmyer to be Xenia).

The novel tells of three generations of women, the wealthy, elderly Margaret Baird, her daughter Hilary, and Hilary's daughter Lucy Anne, aged 9, who live reclusively. Hilary had studied in Italy, supported by her financially successful elder brother Will. There she met and married Paolo, a gifted musician and composer, over her mother's objections. Paolo proved to be a philanderer, and Hilary eventually left him. Margaret has allowed Hilary and Lucy Anne to stay, provided that Lucy Anne be kept ignorant of her father and of music, and has even written her will to provide generous support conditional on continued music avoidance. But Lucy Anne has a natural talent, setting up the "fierce dispute" between mother and grandmother, which is only resolved by Paolo's ghost.

Santmyer acknowledged that the house itself, and its reclusive atmosphere, is based on the "Roberts Villa", in Xenia. The actual occupants had been, when Santmyer was growing up, two elderly spinsters who never went out, and their nephew who sometimes went out the back way.

Like Santmyer's first novel, Herbs and Apples, the novel received a minor reception at the time, but otherwise made no impact. It too was rediscovered when Santmyer became a literary sensation in 1984, and reissued in hardcover (St. Martin's Press, 1987) and paperback (St. Martin's Press, 1988) with an introduction by Weldon Kefauver (Santmyer's editor at Ohio State University Press), three poems by Santmyer, and a biographical postscript.

A 1999 paperback re-issue (OSU Press) had a foreword by Cecilia Tichi (of Vanderbilt University) and the three poems by Santmyer.

== Plot summary ==
One summer, Lucy Anne learns to sing from Aaron, the family's Negro servant, who has not been told this is not allowed. Margaret rebukes Lucy Anne, and explains that she is to stay away from music. When she is caught playing the piano, she is sent to bed. Lucy Anne sneaks out, but when she tries to scale the locked gate, falls and sprains her ankle. Her fall is witnessed by Dr. Martin Child, who climbs the gate and brings the child in and treats her. He is invited back for regular medical visits. Hilary herself is somewhat sick, possibly tuberculosis, and Dr. Martin, who was sweet on Hilary from before she left for Italy, proposes to her and asks her to move with him to a warmer, drier climate. She refuses.

When Lucy Anne has healed, Margaret takes Lucy Anne with her on her once-a-year all-day visit, by interurban train and trolley, to her son Tom, his wife and their daughter. The lousy time Lucy Anne has there—her cousin and friend call her a "wop" among other things—convinces Margaret to revise her will, leaving out the clauses that would force Lucy Anne to live with her Uncle Tom, but otherwise just as controlling. Margaret also catches a terrible cold, a possible pneumonia, and is treated by Dr. Martin.

When Margaret improves enough that it is clear she will recover, she dismisses the doctor and the nursing help. Dr. Martin proposes once more to Hilary, she says she will send him her answer by note that evening, which is again a rejection. That night there is a rainy windstorm, and Hilary wakes up to Lucy Anne's cry of terror. She reports that she had been drawn by music, and that there had been a man playing the piano in the drawing room, whistles some of the music for Hilary who recognizes it, and then Grandmother showed up, the man and Margaret discussed things, with Margaret asking Paolo what does he want and he answers "Lucy Anne", at which point Lucy Anne screamed and ran off. Hilary insists this was just a dream, but finds her mother dead in the drawing room.

The will and its codicil are read, containing terms that are very controlling regarding Hilary and Lucy Anne. Afterwards, while cleaning up, a sheet falls out of a chair cover—the cover for the chair Margaret had died in—and it is one more revision to the will, dated for the day she died, leaving everything to her three children equally and without any conditions attached.

== Reception ==
With an unobtrusive artistry, Miss Santmyer envelopes the situation in an atmosphere akin to a musical mood...

— New York Herald Tribune Books, April 28, 1929, p. 25
