= Jerry Katherman =

American football and basketball player and coach (1896–1972)

Biographical details
- Died: February 1, 1972 (aged 75)

Playing career

Football
- 1917–1920: Ohio Northern

Coaching career (HC unless noted)

Football
- 1921–1922: Xenia HS (OH)
- 1923–1928: Capital

Basketball
- 1923–1929: Capital

Head coaching record
- Overall: 50–37 (college basketball)

Jerry Katherman (April 7, 1896 – February 1, 1972) was an American football and basketball player and coach.

Katherman was a 1921 graduate of Ohio Northern University. He served as the head men's basketball coach Capital University in Columbus, Ohio from 1923 to 1929.
