= "...And Ladies of the Club" =

Book by Helen Hooven Santmyer

- First trade edition (1984)
- Author: Helen Hooven Santmyer
- Cover artist: from Culver Pictures
- Language: English
- Genre: Family saga
- Publisher: Ohio State University Press; G. P. Putnam; Berkley Books
- Publication date: 1982; 1984; 1985
- Publication place: United States
- Media type: Print (hardback); Print (hardback); Print (paperback)
- Pages: 1,344 pp; 1,176 pp; 1,433 pp
- ISBN: 0-8142-0323-X; ISBN 0-399-12965-0; ISBN 0-425-07704-7
- OCLC: 8050632
- Dewey Decimal: 813/.52 19
- LC Class: PS3537.A775 A82 1982

"...And Ladies of the Club" is a 1982 novel, written by Helen Hooven Santmyer, about a group of women in the fictional town of Waynesboro, Ohio who begin a women's literary club, which evolves through the years into a significant community service organization in the town.

The novel, which looks at the club as it changes throughout the years, spans decades in the lives of the women involved in the club, between 1868 and 1932. Many characters are introduced in the course of the novel, but the primary characters are Anne Gordon and Sally Rausch, who in 1868 are new graduates of the Waynesboro Female College. They each marry soon after the opening of the book, and the decades that follow chronicle their marriages and those of their children and grandchildren. Santmyer focuses not just on the lives of the women in the club, but also their families, friends, politics, and developments in their small town and the larger world.

== Synopsis ==
On the day of their graduation from the Waynesboro Female College in 1868, best friends Anne Alexander and Sarah "Sally" Cochran are invited along with several of the college's female teachers by Mrs. Lowrey, who along with her professor husband operates the college, to become founding members of a new local society, the Waynesboro Woman's Club. The club is intended to promote culture and literature among the educated citizens of the Ohio town, while avoiding controversial subjects such as women's suffrage and other reform movements. Socially ambitious Sally agrees to join because she believes the club might become important in the town, and wants to establish herself as a serious-minded member of adult society. Introspective Anne, the class valedictorian, joins in order to support Sally. Other early members of the Club include Miss Louisa Tucker, a beautiful but cold mathematics teacher who later marries the commencement speaker General Deming; scholarly Amanda Reid, who overcame a poor background to earn a degree from Oberlin and has returned to teach at the Female College; Miss Agatha Pinney, an elderly teacher whose sciatica leads to a secret addiction to the laudanum she is prescribed; Mary, Thomasina, and Eliza Ballard, the wife and daughters of a prominent local judge; and the Misses Gardiner, two reclusive spinsters whose nephew, Douglas, attends Princeton and becomes a local attorney and judge.

The club's membership grows over time to include the daughters, granddaughters, and other relatives of the early members, and other society women, particularly the wives of the town's numerous and often-changing Protestant ministers. Although the club itself is framed as non-controversial, club meetings and social events sponsored by its members often lead to discussions and conflicts stemming from the widely varying social and political views of the members and their families on subjects such as race, class, ethnic and religious biases, women's rights, labor reform, and the morality of drinking alcohol, attending the theater and celebrating Christmas.

Anne, the daughter of a doctor, is in love with Dr. John "Dock" Gordon, her father's protege and a friend of her late brother Rob who was killed in the Civil War. Depressed by his war experiences, John gave up his medical practice for several years, but with Anne's encouragement resumes his practice and the two marry. Anne's father consents to the match, but warns her that John is too affected by the suffering he sees as a doctor and that he is likely to make a poor husband, so Anne will have to be very tolerant. Sally develops a relationship with John's friend Captain Ludwig Rausch, who has bought a small local rope-making business and begun building it into a large, updated factory. Although Ludwig is a German immigrant, his ambitions match Sally's and her banker father, approving of his work ethic and prospects, agrees to their marriage. Thomasina Ballard also makes an unexpected marriage to a church organist as a result of a wedding poem she wrote for Anne.

Over the years, Anne and Sally continue their club activities while raising families. Anne and John have a son, Johnny, and a daughter, Binny; Sally and Ludwig have a daughter, Elsa, and several sons. Although John is an intelligent and caring doctor, he is secretly unfaithful to Anne as a way of relieving the pressure of his past war memories and current responsibilities. Anne eventually finds out, and suspects that John has even fathered a child with his cousin Jessamine Stevens in New Orleans. Although deeply hurt by John's behavior, Anne, remembering her father's advice, chooses to overlook it and even welcomes Jessamine and her son when they later move to Waynesboro. Meanwhile, Ludwig becomes a successful industrialist and Sally a prominent local hostess, later taking over the presidency of the club.

Ludwig hires Eliza Ballard as his secretary after she is forced to leave her previous position in her late father's former law firm due to gossiping about partner Doug Gardiner's romance with an Irish Catholic girl whom he later marries. Despite Eliza's gossip and sharp tongue occasionally causing trouble in the town, she shows a softer side by caring for Ariana McCune, a terminally ill young girl who ran away from her oppressively religious parents. Miss Pinney's laudanum addiction eventually becomes public knowledge after she appears increasingly disheveled and unable to control her primary school class. At the instigation of Louisa Deming, Miss Pinney is forced to retire on a small pension and her laudanum supply is cut off. Embarrassed and suffering severe withdrawal, she dies of a heart attack while trying to burn herself to death.

Elsa secretly loves her childhood friend Johnny, but Johnny falls in love with the Demings' daughter Julia, who like her mother is beautiful but cold. Julia is more affectionate towards Johnny's younger sister Binny, who is dazzled by Julia's beauty. Binny gathers violets on a cold damp morning to make Julia a May basket, and is rewarded by a kiss from Julia, but the dampness brings on an attack of rheumatic fever and Binny dies. Johnny and Julia marry and have a son, Tucker, while Elsa marries Gib Evans and has a daughter, Jennifer, who becomes Tucker's close friend. Shortly after the turn of the century, Anne is widowed when John has an accident rushing to help a patient in bad weather, and subsequently dies of pneumonia.

Julia's frigidity causes Johnny to have an affair with his Irish Catholic nurse, Norah O'Neill. Through Johnny, Norah's younger sister Ellen meets Ludwig and Sally's youngest son Paul. Ellen and Paul have a secret romance and Ellen becomes pregnant, resulting in Paul quietly marrying her with Ludwig's consent since he is underage. Although Paul and Ellen are happy, Sally disapproves of the marriage, cuts ties with her son and, in response to a barbed remark by Julia's mother Louisa, informs her about Johnny's affair with Norah. As a result, Julia divorces Johnny, moves to California with Tucker, and later marries a wealthy older man who is past the age of having sex. Johnny, suffering from heart disease and the strain of the divorce, soon dies. Anne and the other members of the club are unaware that Sally was the one who revealed Johnny's affair to Louisa, and instead think Eliza spread the story. Sally eventually is reconciled with Paul after he and his family survive a devastating flood.

Ludwig dies and his daughter Elsa takes over as president of the family-owned bank; she also succeeds her mother as president of the club. Elsa's son Ludwig takes control of his grandfather's company after returning from his service in the Great War, where he was gassed. Tucker, separated from Jennifer by his parents' divorce, meets her again as an adult when they are both serving in France in the war, he as a medical corpsman and she as a nurse. After the war, they marry, and Tucker becomes a doctor and returns to take up his practice in Waynesboro. By the 1930s, Sally is suffering from arteriosclerosis and asks Elsa to bring Anne so that she can confess to Anne that she was the one who revealed Johnny's affair. Elsa talks her out of doing so, noting that Anne is happy with the company of Tucker, Jennifer and their children. As a result, Sally has a farewell visit with Anne but does not mention the situation involving Johnny. Sally dies soon afterwards. In 1932, right after Franklin D. Roosevelt is elected president, Anne, the last surviving founding member of the club, dies and the Club commemorates the end of an era.

== Characters ==
Due to the length of the book and its large number of characters, this list is selective. † denotes a minor character.

=== Gordon/Deming/Stevens family ===
- Anne Alexander Gordon – Valedictorian of her 1868 graduating class at Waynesboro Female College, she marries Dr. John Gordon and encourages him to resume practicing medicine. Although hurt by his occasional infidelities, she chooses to overlook them out of love. In 1932, she becomes the last founding member of the club to die.
- Dr. John "Dock" Gordon – A medical doctor trained by Anne's father, he is haunted by his bad experiences treating casualties in the Civil War, and has trouble dealing with the suffering of his patients, which he internalizes. Despite his difficulties, he is a competent and compassionate doctor, and is especially sensitive to the plight of some of his female patients who have married into bad situations. He loves and marries Anne, but secretly commits adultery with various women as a momentary escape from the pressure of his work and marriage.
- †Dr. Alexander – Anne's father and John Gordon's medical mentor; a widower. He becomes a secret laudanum addict due to pain from rheumatism, and eventually dies of a heart attack.
- †Kate Gordon – John's older sister; an eccentric woman who lives independently and operates her own farm. It is implied that she may be a lesbian, as she has a habit of taking in local farm girls for help and companionship, then becoming angry and making a scene when the girls take an interest in local young men. She commits suicide shortly after Anne and John are married.
- John "Johnny" Gordon, Jr. – Anne and John's oldest child, he aspires to be, and eventually becomes, a doctor like his father. He marries Julia Deming, but is unfaithful to her because she is frigid and does not like sex, and the marriage ends unhappily after she learns he had an affair.
- Belinda "Binny" Gordon – Anne and John's younger child, she has a crush on the older Julia Deming, which Julia seems to reciprocate. She is seen by her father as being similar to his deceased sister Kate as a child. She dies in her early teens from complications of rheumatic fever.
- Louisa Tucker Deming – A mathematics teacher at the College at the time of the club's founding, she is beautiful, but also cold and insensitive to the needs of others. Originally from Boston, she regarded Waynesboro as an uncivilized place when she first arrived. She marries General Deming, a former brigadier general who became the local Congressional representative, and has a daughter, Julia.
- †General Deming – A former brigadier general in the Civil War, he is Waynesboro's elected representative in Congress. He speaks at Anne Alexander and Sally Cochran's graduation from the Female Academy, and later marries their teacher Louisa Tucker. He later is forced to leave office due to his involvement in the Crédit Mobilier bribery scandal of 1872.
- Julia Deming Gordon – The daughter of General Deming and his wife Louisa, she is beautiful and cold like her mother Louisa. Although she enjoys having both men and women admire her beauty, she is not interested in having sex with men. She aspires to a wealthy lifestyle, which she achieves after her divorce from Johnny by marrying a much older rich man. She is possibly a repressed lesbian as shown by her affectionate behavior towards Binny Gordon, including kissing Binny on the mouth.
- Alexander Tucker Gordon – The son and only child of Johnny and Julia Gordon, he is estranged from his father Johnny and grandmother Anne after his parents' divorce. He eventually serves in World War I, returns to Waynesboro, marries Jennifer Evans, and becomes a doctor.
- Jessamine Stevens Edwards – John Gordon's cousin from New Orleans, she is married after the Civil War to an alcoholic husband with whom she has a son, Rodney. However, Anne suspects that Rodney is actually John's child, conceived when John went to visit his cousin. After the death of Jessamine's husband, she brings her son Rodney to Waynesboro to get him out of the unhealthy climate of New Orleans. Much later she marries widower Sheldon Edwards.
- †Rodney Stevens – The son of Jessamine Stevens; possibly fathered by John Gordon. Rodney becomes a doctor in Waynesboro and marries Lavinia Gardiner.
- †Theresa Stevens – The daughter of Rodney and Lavinia Stevens, she writes a historical novel based on Captain Bodien's life.

=== Rausch/Evans family ===
- Sarah "Sally" Cochran Rausch – Anne's best friend and classmate, she is the daughter of the local bank president and wants to establish herself in the society of Waynesboro. She is a founding member of the club and eventually serves for many years as Club president. She marries Ludwig Rausch, who becomes a successful local industrialist, providing Sally with the money and lifestyle to be a prominent local hostess.
- Ludwig Rausch – Born in Germany, he later immigrated to the United States and served in the Civil War with John Gordon. He successfully builds a small local rope-making company into a large factory called the "Rausch Cordage Company." He courts and marries Sally, who is both pretty and, with her family money and social connections, an asset to him in his business career. He is also politically active in the local Republican Party.
- †Mr. and Mrs. Cochran – Sally's parents; her father owns the local bank.
- Elsa Rausch Evans – Sally and Ludwig's oldest child and only daughter. Although she is primarily a housewife and mother, her father recognizes that she has a better head for business than her brothers, and she takes over as head of the family-owned bank after he dies. She is in love with her childhood friend Johnny Gordon, but he falls in love with Julia Deming, so Elsa marries Gib Evans, who had long been in love with her.
- †Gilbert "Gib" Evans – Elsa's childhood friend and eventual husband; the nephew of the local Baptist minister. He works as a traveling salesman for his father-in-law, Ludwig Rausch.
- †Mrs. Gwen Evans – Gib's aunt; the wife of the local Baptist minister.
- Jennifer Evans Gordon – Daughter of Elsa and Gib Evans, she serves as a nurse in Europe in World War I, and eventually marries her childhood friend Tucker Gordon, thus uniting the Gordon and Rausch families.
- Ludwig Evans – Son of Elsa and Gib Evans, he serves in World War I and then takes over the operation of his grandfather Ludwig Rausch's factory. He marries Melissa Patton.
- †Ludwig Rausch Jr. – Sally and Ludwig's spendthrift son, who despite his irresponsibility, redeems himself somewhat by serving in World War I before his death.
- Paul Rausch – The youngest Rausch child and Sally's favorite, he falls in love with Ellen O'Neill, a young Irish Catholic girl, and gets her pregnant while both are underage, leading to a quick marriage. This leads to a family crisis as his father approves of the marriage but his mother does not, and briefly estranges herself from Paul.

=== Ballard/Travers family ===
- Judge Thomas Ballard – A reform-minded State Supreme Court judge who later resigns and returns to legal practice in Waynesboro. When the club is formed, he is the richest and most prominent man in town. He is active in local Republican Party politics, but conflicts with other local members of the party over his support for Horace Greeley in the 1872 presidential election.
- Mrs. Mary Grimes Ballard – The activist wife of Judge Ballard, she supports various causes that are considered radical, including women's suffrage and the temperance movement. She becomes the first president of the club.
- Eliza Ballard – The older daughter of Judge Ballard, she never marries and supports herself first by working as a secretary in her father's law firm. After her father's death, due to her conflict with Douglas Gardiner, a principal of the firm, she is hired as secretary by Ludwig Rausch and competently works for him for many years, until her death. She is blunt and also a busybody and gossip, which sometimes stirs up trouble in the town; she upsets Doug by gossiping about his romantic interest in Barbara Bodien, and is wrongly suspected of being the person who revealed Johnny Gordon's affair to his wife Julia, causing their divorce. Despite her brusque nature, Eliza is kind to Ariana McCune, taking her in and caring for her when she is ill and has no place else to go.
- Thomasina Ballard Travers – The well-educated, but timid, sickly and romantic daughter of Judge Ballard. She unexpectedly marries church organist Samuel Travers, despite his being relatively poor.
- †Samuel Travers – A local church organist and music teacher who marries Thomasina. Although he is at first thought to have married her for her money, the two remain happily married for many years until her death.

=== Lowrey/Edwards family ===
- †Mrs. Rebecca Lowrey and †Professor Lowrey – Owners and operators of the Waynesboro Female College and parents of Kitty Lowrey Edwards. Mrs. Lowrey spearheads the founding of the club. Although well educated, she is a poor housekeeper who spends much of her time dealing with her daughter Ellen's unruly children. In 1875, the Lowreys close the college, which has ceased to be financially viable, sell the buildings to clear their debt, and move to Kansas where the Professor has been offered a position.
- †Ellen Lowrey Tyler – The Lowreys' older daughter, who has several unruly young children. She repeatedly leaves her husband during the 1870s, and brings her children to stay with her parents.
- Katherine "Kitty" Lowrey Edwards – The Lowrey's younger daughter, she attends Oberlin, and is considered a "tomboy" and a "bluestocking". She and Sheldon Edwards fall in love, but must delay their marriage until the Lowrey debt is resolved, and then Kitty has trouble carrying a child to term. With Dock Gordon's help she manages to have two sons, but her health is destroyed by the pregnancies and she dies at a young age.
- †Sheldon Edwards – The son of a prosperous Waynesboro dry goods merchant, and the Oberlin classmate and eventual husband of Kitty Lowrey. After her untimely death, he raises their sons alone. Many years later when the children have grown up and left home, he marries Jessamine Stevens.

=== Gardiner/Bodien family ===
- Miss Caroline and Miss Lavinia Gardiner – Two unmarried, reclusive sisters originally from Virginia whose father was Judge Ballard's law partner. Their father, an abolitionist, freed his slaves, thus losing most of the family fortune and forcing the family to have to move to Ohio to escape the anger of pro-slavery neighbors. As a result of the social rejection they suffered in Virginia, the Misses Gardiner chose to isolate themselves from others and give off an air of being aristocratic. At the time of founding of the club, they are in their forties and raising their teenage nephew, Douglas Gardiner. They decide to accept the invitation to join the club in order to become more a part of the community.
- Douglas "Doug" Gardiner – The nephew of Miss Caroline and Miss Lavinia Gardiner, he is raised by them, attends Princeton, and becomes a local attorney and partner in Judge Ballard's law firm. He later becomes a judge himself. An individual with a club foot, he initially is angry and argumentative, but later mellows after meeting and marrying Barbara Bodien over his aunts' objections.
- Barbara Bodien Gardiner – The daughter of Captain Bodien, raised as an Irish Catholic by her mother, she works as a clerk in Sheldon Edwards' shop, where she meets Doug Gardiner. The two marry and have several children, but because of her background, Barbara is not accepted by many society women, except for Kitty Edwards.
- †Lavinia Gardiner – One of the daughters of Doug and Barbara Gardiner, she marries Rodney Stevens.
- Mary Gardiner – The youngest daughter of Doug and Barbara Gardiner, she becomes a labor activist and unsuccessfully tries to organize the workers of the Rausch Cordage Company. She later marries Franz Lichtenstein.

=== Blair/Voorhees family ===
- Rev. Dr. Blair – Head of the Reformed Presbyterian Theological Seminary that buys the buildings of the Waynesboro Female Institute; a widower. He later dies of emphysema.
- Christina Blair Voorhees – Dr. Blair's pretty daughter who becomes a longstanding member of the club, marries bank clerk Henry Voorhees, and has two children, Blair and Janey. At first she appears willing to defy convention by appearing in an amateur dramatic production at Sally Rausch's Christmas party, although many Reformed Presbyterians disapprove of the theatre. As time goes by, she becomes more rigid and controlling, and overprotects her children to the detriment of their social development.
- †Henry Voorhees – A cashier in the Cochran family bank, he marries Christina Blair after Sally Cochran Rausch plays matchmaker. He sees that Blair and Janey are not fitting in with the rest of the local children, but is unable to convince Christina to change her ways.
- Blair Voorhees – The son of Christina and Henry, Blair is a "mama's boy" who resorts to physical violence when involved in a disagreement. Although not permitted to drink alcohol by his parents, he tries some at a party given by the Rausches, causing a family argument and crisis. Sent off to seminary school, he is suspended after drinking liquor with a group of other students, getting into a fight and severely injuring another student. He runs away to enlist in the military and becomes permanently estranged from his family. He is later seen serving in World War I and apparently still drinking.
- †Janey Voorhees Lane – The daughter of Christina and Henry, she has a reputation for being dull and a tattletale. She later becomes a member of the club and marries a seminarian.

=== McCune family ===
- Rev. Mr. McCune – The strict Reformed Presbyterian minister, he dominates his weak wife Mary and their many children. He impregnates Mary again contrary to Dock Gordon's medical advice, as she is in poor health. After Mary dies, he unsuccessfully tries to court Amanda Reid.
- Mrs. Mary McCune – Rev. McCune's wife, she is controlled and probably abused by her husband, although she stands up to him once by attending a theatrical party given by Sally Rausch. She dies from the combined effects of many pregnancies and pulmonary tuberculosis.
- Ariana McCune – The McCunes' rebellious and dramatic daughter, she is a childhood friend of Johnny Gordon, and has a talent for music and acting. She attends music lessons at the Ballard home, and the Ballard sisters, especially Eliza, take an interest in her. As a young teenager, she runs away from her oppressive family, gets married and joins a traveling acting troupe. She later returns to Waynesboro terminally ill and is cared for by the Ballard sisters until her death.
- †Ruhamah McCune – Ariana's younger sister, she becomes the librarian of the first Waynesboro lending library, initially established by the club, and continues as town librarian for many years. Although regarded as knowledgeable about books, she is never asked to join the Club due to her lack of formal education.

=== Other major characters ===
- Amanda Reid – The daughter of a widow who operates a boarding house, she is an intelligent, dedicated scholar who obtains a "man's degree" from Oberlin College and then returns to teach at the Female College. Due to her sex, she is unable to obtain a position in academia elsewhere. Later she becomes a public school teacher. She is considered unusual by others because she prefers a scholarly and mostly solitary life, and has no desire to marry or have children.
- Mrs. Rhoda McKinney – Wife of the Presbyterian minister and a friend of Mrs. Ballard, she is an outspoken reformer and activist. After joining the club, she leads a controversial temperance crusade.
- Miss Agatha Pinney – An elderly, unmarried teacher of elementary school pupils and a founding member of the club. She develops a laudanum addiction after being prescribed the drug for pain, and her addiction worsens to the point where she is unable to control her class or teach, and often falls asleep during school hours. When the townspeople find out about this, she is forced to retire, given a pension too small to purchase her necessary laudanum, and the local druggist is warned not to give her any more. In the throes of withdrawal, she tries to burn herself to death and dies of a heart attack.
- Captain Bodien – A former military officer who moves with his family to Waynesboro from Baltimore to work as Ludwig Rausch's superintendent. He later becomes Rausch's business partner. He becomes well known for telling the local children stories about the Civil War, and Theresa Stevens eventually writes a book about him.
- Naomi Patton – The young daughter of the Rev. Andrew Patton, a Presbyterian minister who comes to Waynesboro in the early 1900s. She is aloof at first, but becomes more outgoing through her friendship with Jennifer Evans. She dies at age 13 in 1909 in an epidemic of poliomyelitis.

=== Other minor characters ===
- †Miss Susan Crenshaw – A retired teacher of Latin and Greek at the Female College and a founding member of the club. She dies of cancer a few years later.
- †Mr. Thirkield and †Bill Thirkield – Mr. Thirkield operates the town drugstore; his son, Bill, is a contemporary and friend of Johnny Gordon and Elsa Rausch.
- †Mrs. Reid – Amanda Reid's mother who operates a boarding house for seminary students. She is a strict Reformed Presbyterian who often clashes with her more open-minded daughter.
- †Charlotte Bonner – The daughter of the local newspaper editor, she grows up in Waynesboro, obtains a college degree and becomes a Club member. She joins the newspaper staff and makes news reporting her career.
- †Stewart Bodien – The son of Captain Bodien, he becomes an engineer and inventor, and eventually manages a paper mill started by Ludwig Rausch.
- †Rudy Lichtenstein and †Sophie Klein Lichtenstein – The children of German immigrants, both grow up in Waynesboro, are excellent students, and marry as adults. Following in his father's footsteps, Rudy becomes a lawyer with a strong interest in workers' rights. His wife, Sophie, obtains a college degree and becomes a member of the club in spite of her German background.
- †Franz Lichtenstein – The half-brother of Rudy Lichtenstein, Franz becomes an activist and labor organizer, and along with Mary Gardiner, unsuccessfully attempts to organize the Rausch Cordage Company workers. He and Mary later marry and move to New York City to continue their work.
- †Norah and †Ellen O'Neill – Two Irish Catholic sisters who are not accepted by the Protestant society of the town. The elder, Norah, becomes Johnny Gordon's nurse and has an affair with him. The younger, Ellen, a talented musician just out of convent school, falls in love with Paul Rausch and after getting pregnant, becomes his wife over his mother's objections.
- †Reverend Andrew Patton and †Mrs. Deborah Patton – A Presbyterian minister, recently converted from Reformed Presbyterianism, and his wife who arrive in Waynesboro in the early 1900s. The father and stepmother of Naomi Patton, they also have two children of their own, Melissa and David.
- †Melissa Patton – The Pattons' younger daughter, who marries Ludwig Evans following World War I.

== Background ==
=== Writing ===
From 1922 to 1930, Santmyer wrote three novels. The first two were published to little notice and the third was unpublished. She disliked Sinclair Lewis's negative portrayal of small-town America in his novel Main Street, and conceived of Ladies as an antidote. However, since she worked full-time, she was unable to write very much before her retirement in 1959.

A collection of her nostalgic reminiscences of Xenia, Ohio was published as Ohio Town by Ohio State University Press in 1962. The director of the Press, Weldon Kefauver, encouraged her to write more. In 1976 she submitted eleven boxes containing bookkeeping ledgers, her manuscript of Ladies in longhand. Kefauver accepted the novel, but wanted it trimmed. By then, Santmyer was spending much of her time in a nursing home and she dictated changes to her friend Mildred Sandoe. The Press published the novel, printed 1,500 copies and sold a few hundred, priced at $35, mostly to libraries. In 1983, Santmyer was forced to move permanently into a nursing home for health reasons.

Ladies was awarded the 1983 Ohioana Book Award in the category of fiction, but otherwise gained little attention at the time.

=== Success ===
One local library patron, in returning the book, told the librarian that it was the greatest novel she had ever read. Another patron, Grace Sindell, overheard this and checked the book out herself. After reading it, she agreed with the assessment and called her son Gerald in Hollywood. He was at first reluctant to look at the book, believing that anything that was that good would already be taken. Unable to find a copy in California, he ordered one directly from the publisher and agreed that it had great potential. He convinced his Hollywood friend Stanley Corwin of the same and the two purchased movie, TV and republication rights. No film or television based upon the novel was ever produced. They sought literary representation from Owen Laster, literary head of the William Morris Agency, who read the book and also believed it was of considerable importance. Laster held an auction for the book, which was won by G. P. Putnam's Sons to republish the book. Before republication, the Book-of-the-Month club chose Ladies as their main selection. Suddenly, Santmyer and her novel were a media sensation, including front-page coverage in the New York Times. The paperback edition, published by Berkley Books in 1985, sold more than 2 million copies between June and September, making it the best-selling paperback in history at the time.

== Reception ==
Most reviews were enthusiastic. A few were grudging and even hostile.
