= Farewell, Summer =

1988 novella by Helen Hooven Santmyer

- Cover, first edition
- Author: Helen Hooven Santmyer
- Illustrator: Deborah Healy
- Cover artist: Deborah Healy
- Language: English
- Genre: Psychological fiction
- Publisher: Houghton Mifflin
- Publication date: 1988
- Publication place: United States
- Media type: Print (Hardcover and Paperback)
- Pages: 132 pp
- ISBN: 0-06-015889-1

Farewell, Summer is a novella by Helen Hooven Santmyer. Written after her first two novels, it was not published until after Santmyer's death. The novella tells the 1935 memories of Elizabeth Lane about the summer of 1905, when she had been eleven and in love with her "Wild West cousin" Steve Van Doren, who was romancing, to no avail, another cousin, Damaris, who is intent on never marrying and is planning on becoming a nun. The 1935 Elizabeth now understands what the 1905 Elizabeth was actually seeing.

At the time of her 1984 fame, Santmyer, aged 88, no longer remembered the novella, but a niece remembered seeing the manuscript, and a search was made for it amongst her papers.

The brief plot summary that Theresa Stevens, the writer character in Santmyer's "...And Ladies of the Club", gives for her second book describes a woman who remembers twenty years back a romance that she had been too young to understand at the time.

== Plot summary ==
In 1935, Elizabeth Lake, a 41-year-old academic, feels compelled to return to Sunbury, Ohio, where she had sometimes stayed with her maternal grandparents as a child. Intending to do some professional writing, she runs into her cousin Tune, now in his 90s, whom she had not seen since she was last in Sunbury thirty years before. Tune tells Elizabeth she ought to write down the story of the old days of the town, which causes Elizabeth to recall her cousin Steve Van Doren and her own mistake that contributed to his death.

In 1905, twenty-one-year-old Steve arrives in Sunbury from Texas after the death of his father. He is only able to find a little bit of work. Eleven-year-old Elizabeth, who is staying in Sunbury, develops a crush on him. Steve falls in love with his cousin Damaris, but while Damaris is attracted to Steve, she is too frightened of uncertainty to contemplate marriage, and intends to become a nun.

Crazy cousin Tobias, called Tobe or Bias, who was wounded in the Battle of Chickamauga, is determined to dig up the thousand dollars in gold he is certain he buried after the Civil War, but he cannot remember the location. In order to "cure" Bias of his obsession, Steve buries his own complete earnings of a hundred dollars in gold coins, mixed with shiny pennies. Steve thinks that Bias, with his poor vision and hands, will be unable to tell the difference between the pennies and the additional gold. However, Bias does realize the difference, thinks someone has stolen from him, and becomes so angry that he hurls the coins down the outhouse toilet.

Elizabeth, hiding, overhears the last conversation between Steve and Damaris, in which Damaris rejects his marriage proposal while admitting that she loves him. The episode with the coins figures in her reasoning. Steve is dejected, but no one other than Elizabeth and Damaris knows why, and he announces that he plans to return to Texas. Damaris asks Elizabeth to pass on a message to Steve that she will "always be faithful". Elizabeth knows the message is meant to sound like a reference to Damaris' religion to everyone but Steve, who will understand that it refers to himself. Elizabeth does not pass on the message.

Steve disappears, leaving a note apologizing for not repeating his plans to return to Texas, since it would sound like he was asking for money. Elizabeth's grandmother is perplexed, until Elizabeth explains about the incident with Cousin Bias. Steve then dies in an accident while "riding the rods".

Elizabeth spends the following Christmas with her parents in England. They receive a letter from Sunbury, mentioning Damaris' upcoming marriage.

== Reception ==
Farewell, Summer is a novella that relieves its reader of emotional upheavals ... it amuses with fond childhood memories.

— Rose Russell Stewart, Toledo Blade

[It is a] stylistically dated but curiously engaging story...

— –, Kirkus Reviews

The author shines in her loving recollections of turn-of-the-century Ohio and her exploration of the ties that bind and break families.

— –, Publishers Weekly

Santmyer's fans will enjoy this slim, old-fashioned tale which pays careful attention to detail in describing family relationships.

— –, The State Journal-Register
