= Coates Kinney =

American politician and poet

- Born: November 24, 1826; Penn Yan, New York, US
- Died: January 25, 1904 (aged 77)
- Occupations: Lawyer, politician, journalist, and poet
- Relatives: Allen Carpé (grandson)

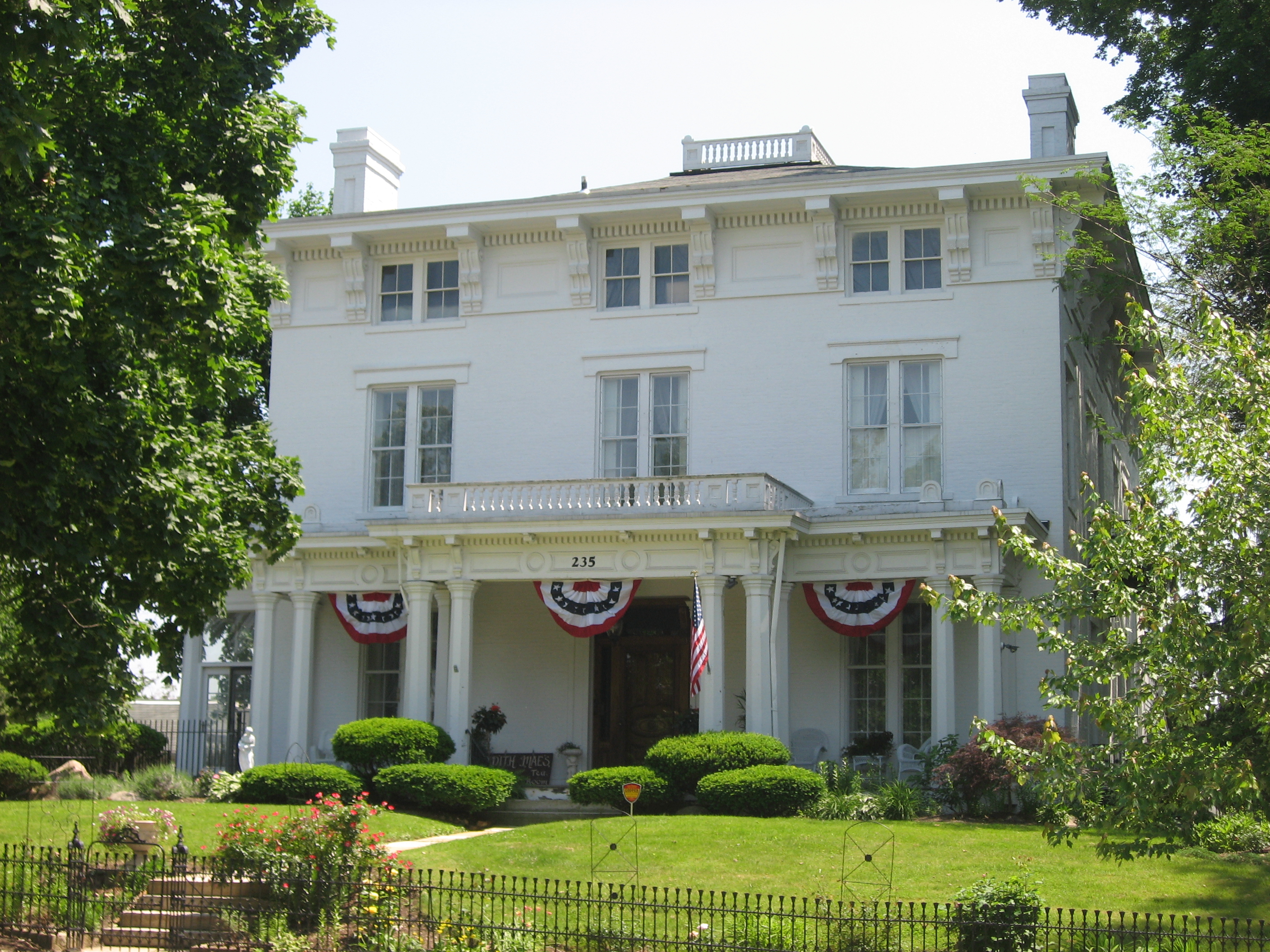
Kinney's home on East Second Street in Xenia

Coates Kinney (November 24, 1826 – January 25, 1904) was an American lawyer, politician, journalist and poet who wrote Rain On The Roof.

== Biography ==
Coates Kinney was born in 1826 near Penn Yan, New York. He was partly educated at Antioch College, Yellow Springs, Ohio, and was accompanied by Thomas Corwin, a former US secretary of the Treasury, while he studied law. He was admitted to the bar in Cincinnati in 1856 and was considered a fine lawyer. He became a journalist, and worked on papers in Cincinnati, Xenia, and Springfield, Illinois.

== Works ==
- Keeuka (1855)
- Lyrics of the Ideal and the Real (1888)
- Rain On The Roof (lyrical poem)

== Sources ==
- Gilman, D. C.; Peck, H. T.; Colby, F. M., eds. (1905). "Kinney, Coates" . New International Encyclopedia (1st ed.). New York: Dodd, Mead.
- Wilson, J. G.; Fiske, J., eds. (1892). "Kinney, Coates" . Appletons' Cyclopædia of American Biography. New York: D. Appleton.
