= Millen–Schmidt House =

Historic house in Ohio, United States

- U.S. National Register of Historic Places
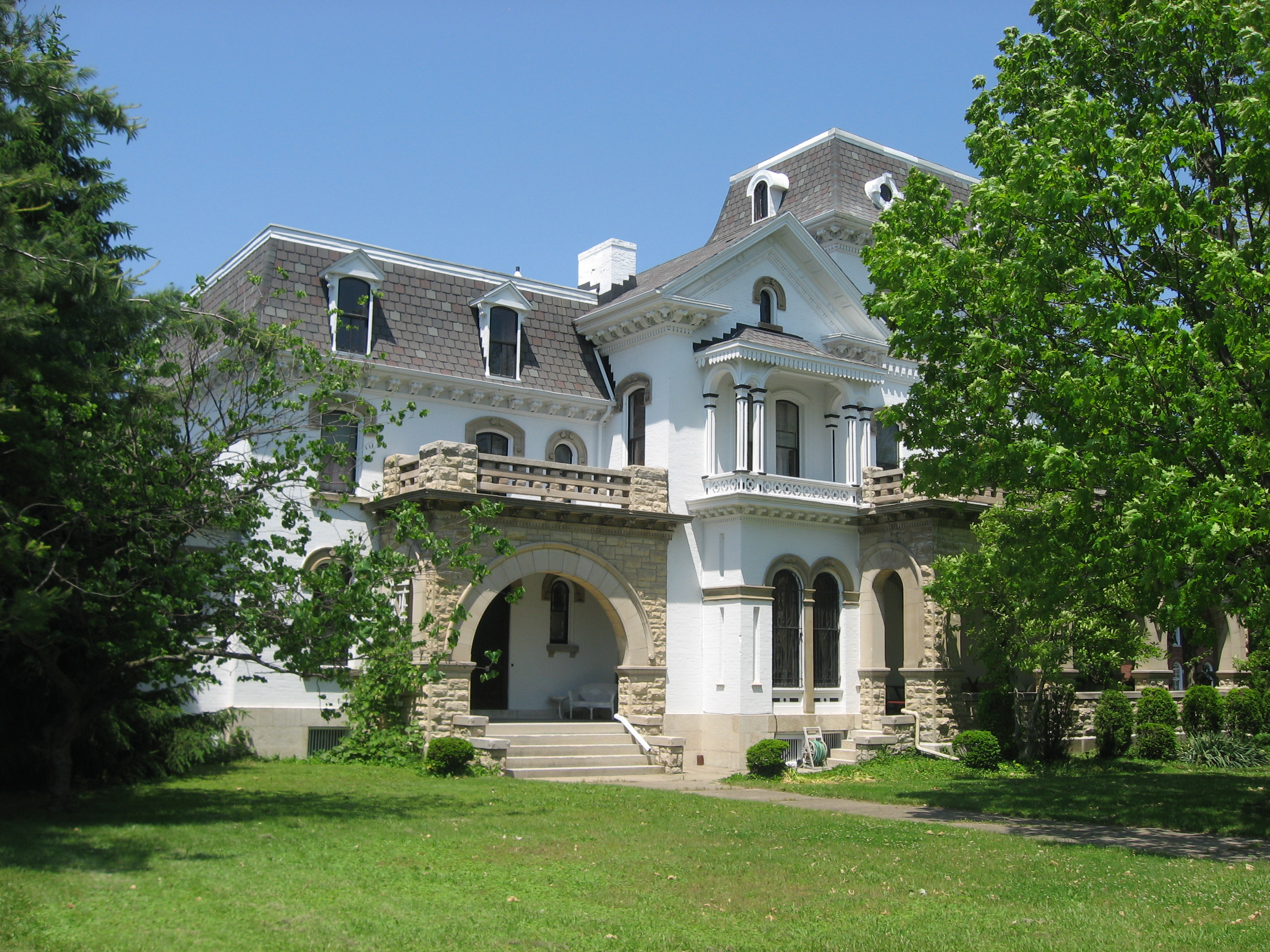
- Southern side of the house

- Location within Ohio Location within the United States
- Location: 184 N. King St., Xenia, Ohio
- Coordinates: 39°41′14″N 83°55′54″W
- Area: Less than 1 acre (0.40 ha)
- Built: 1871
- Architectural style: Italian Villa
- NRHP reference No.: 76001432
- Added to NRHP: November 7, 1976

The Millen–Schmidt House is a historic residence in Xenia, Ohio, United States. Built in the late nineteenth century, it was named a historic site after surviving a massive tornado.

Eli Millen settled in Xenia in 1837, having left South Carolina because of his sense of revulsion toward slavery. After operating a dry goods store for several years, he expanded his operation to include pork packing and butchering. Later in life, Millen travelled to Europe, where he saw and admired a massive Italian mansion. After returning to America, he learned that a similar house had been built in New York, so he hired the architect to design a similar residence in Xenia's upscale North King Street neighborhood; it was completed in 1871. In 1912, the house was purchased by Henry E. Schmidt, a well-off produce merchant.

Built of brick on a stone foundation, the Italianate-styled Millen–Schmidt House features elements of sandstone. Its overall plan is in the shape of the letter "T"; two stories tall, it comprises a three-story rectangular tower with two Second Empire-styled gable-roofed portions that form the rest of the house. The house is entered through a Romanesque Revival-styled porch, built of stone. Originally, the interior was so elaborate that its completion required two years of work.

On 3 April 1974, much of Xenia's near north side was destroyed by one of the worst tornadoes on record. Two years later, it was listed on the National Register of Historic Places, qualifying because of its historically significant architecture. Millen's goal of having "a house that people will notice" remained true over a century after its completion. Another house on North King that survived the tornado, known as the Samuel N. Patterson House, is located two blocks to the north; it too was listed on the National Register in 1976.
