= Xenia Community Schools =

School district in Ohio

The Xenia Community School District serves the general Xenia, Ohio area. There are five elementary schools, one middle school, one high school, and one preschool. The current superintendent is Dr Gabriel Lofton and the current President of the Board of Education is Mary Grech.

== Schools ==
=== Preschool ===
- Xenia Preschool

=== Elementary schools ===
- Arrowood Elementary School
- Cox Elementary School
- McKinley Elementary School
- Shawnee Elementary School
- Tecumseh Elementary School

=== Middle school ===
- Warner Middle School

=== High school ===
- Xenia High School
- Xenia virtual academy
