= Helen Hooven Santmyer =

American writer (1895–1986)

- 1984 publicity photograph, Santmyer autographing a copy of Ladies
- Born: November 25, 1895; Cincinnati, Ohio, U.S.
- Died: February 21, 1986 (aged 90); Xenia, Ohio, U.S.
- Occupations: Novelist; educator; librarian
- Writing career
- Notable work: "...And Ladies of the Club"

Helen Hooven Santmyer (November 25, 1895 – February 21, 1986) was an American writer, educator, and librarian. She is primarily known for her best-selling epic "...And Ladies of the Club", published when she was in her 80s.

== Life and career ==
=== Early life and education ===
Santmyer was born on November 25, 1895, in Cincinnati, Ohio, the oldest child of Joseph Wright and Bertha Hooven Santmyer. Her father had been a medical student in Cincinnati, but in 1900 switched to business and moved to the Hooven family home in Xenia, Ohio, taking a position with the R.A. Kelly Company, a rope manufacturer. Inspired by Louisa May Alcott, Santmyer was determined to become a writer and kept a diary from age 10. She also derived inspiration from her grandfathers; both were veterans of the American Civil War and would relate stories of their service. She furthermore derived negative inspiration from her mother, who she felt sacrificed a promising career as an artist for the sake of marriage and children, and was determined never to marry.

As a child, Santmyer had a severe case of undulant fever. She recovered, but was left weakened for life, and sometimes subject to bed confinement with fevers or a heart flutter. She would always find it difficult to work and write at the same time.

She was brought up Presbyterian. Her mother and grandmother were regular church attendees. In later years, she no longer believed in doctrine, and did not attend services.

She attended Wellesley College 1914–18 and was active in the struggle for women's rights; she began publishing her poetry as an undergraduate. The 1916 Alfred Noyes edited collection, A Book of Princeton Verse (poems by Princeton students), was widely read in Santmyer's circle, and strongly influenced her. She quit her clubs and committees and wrote a manifesto that appeared in The Wellesley College Magazine, May 1917, criticizing women who do not dedicate themselves to their art, the way she presumed men did.

After graduation, Santmeyer took a job as an editorial secretary with Scribner's in New York City for two years. She submitted articles and poetry to magazines, but all were rejected. She returned to Xenia, teaching locally and at Wellesley College, during which time she wrote her first novel, Herbs and Apples, based on her life in Xenia, college, and working for Scribner's. After Wellesley, Santmyer attended Oxford University in England for three years, 1924–27. During her time there, she met and befriended a fellow Xenian, the poet Ridgely Torrence. She wrote a thesis on British women writers, focusing largely on Clara Reeve, who lived in the 18th and 19th centuries. Culminating her studies at Oxford, Santmyer was awarded a B.Litt. degree.

After finishing at Oxford, Santmyer returned to Xenia. In 1927, she befriended Mildred Sandoe, a librarian, who would become her literary assistant and later her life partner until Mildred's death almost fifty years later. In 1928, she joined the Xenia Woman's Club. During this time she wrote her second novel, The Fierce Dispute, published in 1929 with Houghton Mifflin. In the summer of 1930, Santmyer became a MacDowell colonist. There, she wrote her third novel, Farewell, Summer (published posthumously) and befriended actor and playwright Daniel Reed and novelist Thornton Wilder.

The Depression forced the closure of the rope factory where Santmyer's father worked. He found employment in Orange County, California, the house was sold, and the family relocated to the West Coast. While in California, Santmyer started writing Ohio Town and Ladies. But after three years, her father retired due to failing health. Santmyer and her parents returned to near Xenia.

=== Main career ===
In 1935, she accepted the positions as Dean of Women and English department head at Cedarville College, in Cedarville, Ohio, then chartered as a Reformed Presbyterian college. During this time her writing continued, but because of her health, very slowly. At some point Santmyer became frustrated with New York publishing houses and ceased submitting manuscripts to them. In 1953, Cedarville College was purchased by a Baptist association, which demanded faculty to adhere to their Biblical literalism, and did not permit smoking or drinking. Santmyer resigned from the faculty.

Santmyer and her parents moved back to the former Hooven family home, which had been repurchased by her brother-in-law. Santmyer's friend Sandoe, then working at the Dayton Public Library, found a position there for Santmyer as a research librarian, and provided the daily commute. Santmyer's father died in 1954, and her mother died in 1955. Sandoe then moved into the Santmyer house.

=== Retirement and main writing ===
Upon retirement in 1959, Santmyer returned to full-time writing, publishing Ohio Town, reminiscences of Xenia, in 1962 with Ohio State University Press. Weldon Kefauver, director of OSU Press, encouraged her to publish with them again. Santmyer then wrote the bulk of Ladies, submitting it to OSU Press in 1976. The manuscript was written out entirely in longhand in dozens of ledger books and arrived in 11 boxes. Kefauver accepted the manuscript but required heavy abridgment. Also as of 1976, Santmyer had the first of several stays in Hospitality Home East, a Xenia nursing home, where most of the revision was done.

In 1982, "...And Ladies of the Club" was published obscurely by OSU Press: it was the publisher's second novel, there was no separate advertising budget, and only a few hundred copies of the book were sold, mostly to Ohio libraries. By April 1983, nearly blind and suffering from emphysema, Santmyer moved permanently into the nursing home. By chance, the novel ended up being read by some in the Hollywood entertainment industry who saw its potential for a larger audience. This led to the book's republication by Putnam in 1984 and its becoming a main selection of the Book-of-the-Month Club. Both Santmyer and the novel subsequently received considerable media attention with the novel becoming a best-seller.

Santmyer died at age 90 on February 21, 1986. By her request, she was buried in a private ceremony in Xenia's Woodland Cemetery. She was unmarried and had no children.

The former Hooven family home on 113 West 3rd Street, Xenia, has been marked with an Ohio Historical Marker by the Ohio Historical Connection.

== Bibliography ==
=== Published ===
- Herbs and Apples (1925)
- The Fierce Dispute (1929)
- "The Cemetery" (Antioch Review, Spring 1956; excerpt from Ohio Town)
- "There Were Fences" (Antioch Review, Spring 1962; excerpt from Ohio Town)
- Ohio Town (1962)
- "...And Ladies of the Club" (1982)
- Farewell, Summer (1988)

=== Unpublished ===
- The Life and Works of Clara Reeve (1927 thesis, 513 pages)
- The Hall with Eight Doors (363 pages)

== Awards and achievements ==
- 1964, Florence Roberts Head Award, for Ohio Town
- 1983, Ohioana Book Award in the category of fiction, for "...And Ladies of the Club"
- 1984, 37 consecutive weeks on the New York Times bestseller list, seven weeks at number-one (Ladies)
- 1984, inducted into Ohio Women's Hall of Fame
- 1984, Honorary Degree, Wright State University
- 1985, Central State University held a conference on Ladies
- 1985, Ohio Governor's Award
- 1987, 4 consecutive weeks on the New York Times paperback bestseller list (Herbs and Apples)

== Legacy ==
- The Helen Hooven Santmyer Prize, awarded annually since 1991 in the amount of $2500, was established by the OSU Press for the "best book-length manuscript on the contributions of women, their lives and experiences, and their role in society."
- The Helen Hooven Santmyer Award for Excellence is a college scholarship.

== Notes ==
- Galloway, Paul (June 10, 1984). "Move over, Jane Austen—Miss Santmyer has finally arrived". Chicago Tribune, Sunday Tempo. p. A1.
- Quay, Joyce Crosby (1995). Early Promise, Late Reward: A Biography of Helen Hooven Santmyer, author of "...And Ladies of the Club". Knowledge, Ideas and Trends.
- Santmyer, Helen Hooven (1962). Ohio Town. Ohio State University Press.
