= Bank of Xenia =

- Bank Of Xenia
- U.S. National Register of Historic Places
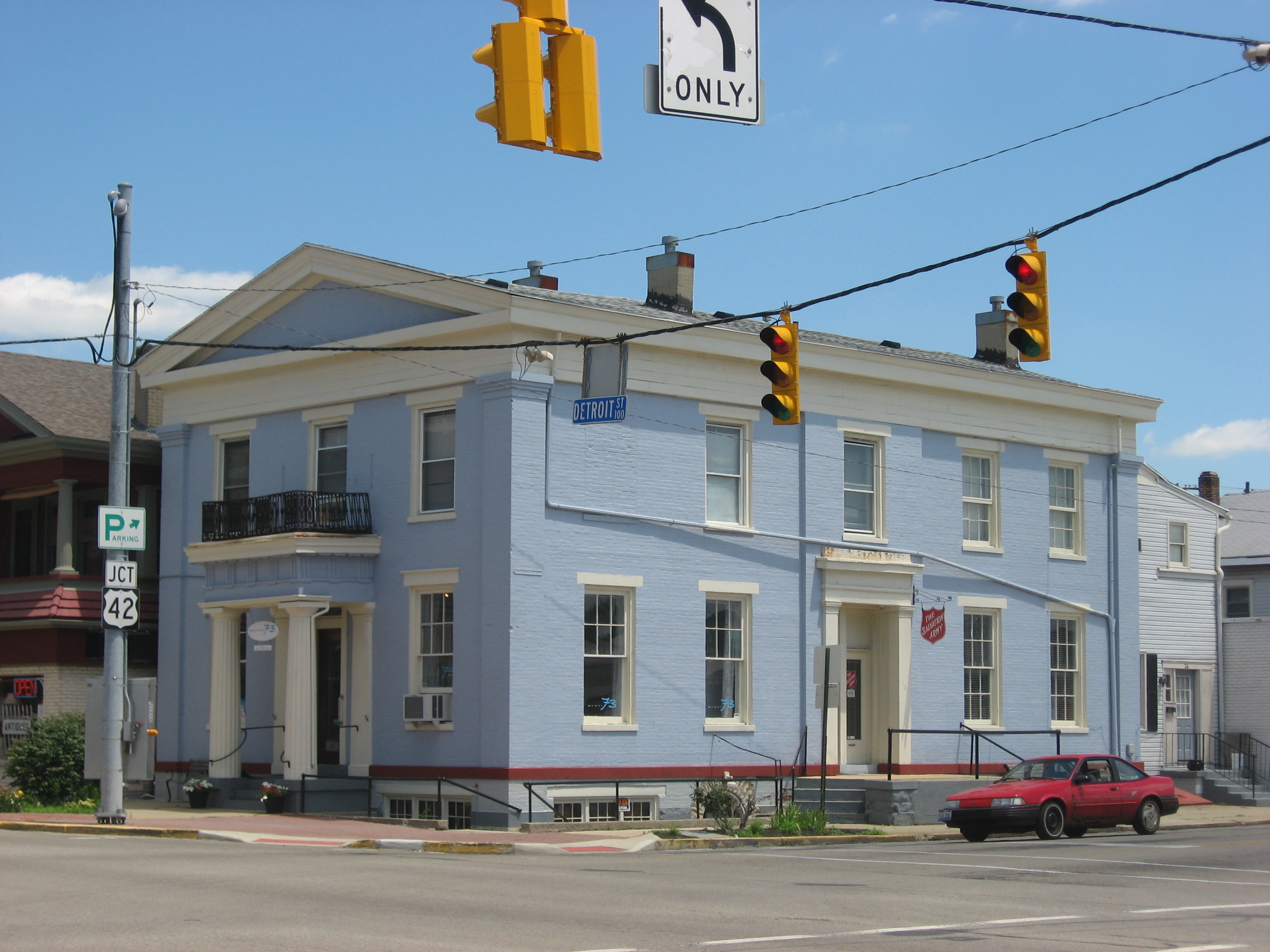
- Front and southern side of the bank

- Location within Ohio Location within the United States
- Location: Northeastern corner of the junction of Detroit and E. Second Streets
- Nearest city: Xenia, Ohio
- Coordinates: 39°41′2″N 83°55′44″W
- Area: Less than 1 acre (0.40 ha)
- Built: 1835
- Architectural style: Greek Revival
- NRHP reference No.: 73001450
- Added to NRHP: May 7, 1973

The Bank of Xenia is a historic former bank building in downtown Xenia, Ohio, United States. Built in 1835, it was the location of Greene County's first bank, which opened on June 1 of that year. For thirty years, the building was used as a bank, becoming the local branch of the State Bank of Ohio in 1846 and changing its name to First National Bank in 1863. After First National moved to a newer building in 1865, it was no longer used as a bank; among its later owners was A.C. Messenger, a physician who used it as his home and office. In the 1880s, the bank was a party to a lawsuit known as Xenia Bank v. Stewart, which was decided by the United States Supreme Court in 1885.

Built in a heavily Greek Revival style of architecture, upon a stone foundation, the bank is a two-story structure constructed with a rectangular plan. Located along Detroit Street in downtown Xenia, its pilastered appearance is dominated by the entrance porch, which features two columns built in the Doric order. Above the columns is a small second-story balcony, which is protected by a wrought iron railing; the frieze on the balcony's side includes both metopes and triglyphs that alternate in a classical style.

In 1973, the Bank of Xenia was listed on the National Register of Historic Places, qualifying because of its historically significant architecture. The second Xenia location to be added to the Register, following the East Second Street Historic District, it survived the devastating tornado of the following year. The building is currently occupied by Byuti 73, a beauty salon.
