= Herbs and Apples =

1925 novel by Helen Hooven Santmyer

- Author: Helen Hooven Santmyer
- Language: English
- Genre: Bildungsroman
- Publisher: Houghton Mifflin
- Publication date: 1925
- Publication place: United States
- Media type: Print (Hardcover)
- Pages: 397 pp (1st edition, hardcover)

Herbs and Apples is a 1925 novel by Helen Hooven Santmyer. Her first novel, it was largely autobiographical. Set in the fictional town of Tecumseh, Ohio, an unnamed Boston-area women's college, and Manhattan, it tells the story of Derrick Thornton, an aspiring female writer and poet, who ends up preferring the "herbs and apples" of Tecumseh to any sort of literary life.

The novel received a minor reception at the time, but otherwise made no impact. It was rediscovered when Santmyer became a literary sensation in 1984, and reissued in hardcover (Harper & Row, 1985) and paperback (St. Martin's Press, 1987), with an introduction and three poems by Santmyer.

== Plot ==
The story is told in the first person by Sue, who had met the young Derrick once, and then meets her a second time on the train taking them to the same college. At college, the two girls form a clique dedicated to literature and philosophy with four other freshmen, Alice, Edith, Madeleine, and Frances. Derrick is easily the most ambitious and talented of them, writing poetry. She argues forcefully that marriage is an abdication of artistic talent, and vows never to get married.

During the summer between their freshman and sophomore years, World War I breaks out, and the United States enters the war a few months before they graduate. Derrick, Sue, and Alice move to Manhattan, where Derrick finds a secretarial job working for a literary magazine. She continues to write poetry, and most of one play. On home visits, she argues with her childhood friend, Jack Devlin, whose support of pacifism angers her. To her shock and fear, he enlists, and she agrees to consider marriage on his return. Jack is killed in action, and Derrick takes it very hard.

Shortly afterwards, Derrick's mother becomes deathly ill, and Derrick moves back to Tecumseh, destroying her drafts. As the oldest child of six, she finds herself replacing her mother in her siblings' lives. She accepts a teaching job at an elementary school. Sue later visits, and barely recognizes Derrick, who is serene and happy with her lot.

== Reception ==
[It] is a dignified piece of writing, whose seriousness of purpose bears a promise for the future.

— –, New York Times Book Review

Yet scattered through this oddly compounded book are passages of a breath-taking delicacy and poignancy, of insight and power beyond cavil.

— E. B. H., New Republic

Its tale of youthful rebelliousness seems to have been written for high-spirited admirers of Jo March.

— Ann Hulbert, The New York Times Book Review

== Bibliography ==
=== Early book reviews ===
- Anon. (September 13, 1925a). "Ambition Compromises". New York Times Book Review. pp. 17–19.
- Anon. (November 14, 1925b). "Herbs and Apples". The Saturday Review of Literature. II (16): 301.
- E. B. H. (January 6, 1926). "Recent Fiction". New Republic. Vol. XLV. p. 198.

=== Later book reviews ===
- Anon. (1985). "Herbs and Apples". Kirkus Reviews.
- Hulbert, Ann (November 10, 1985). "In Short". The New York Times Book Review. p. BR28.
