= East Second Street Historic District (Xenia, Ohio) =

Historic district in Ohio, United States

- East Second Street District and Boundary Increase
- U.S. National Register of Historic Places
- U.S. Historic district
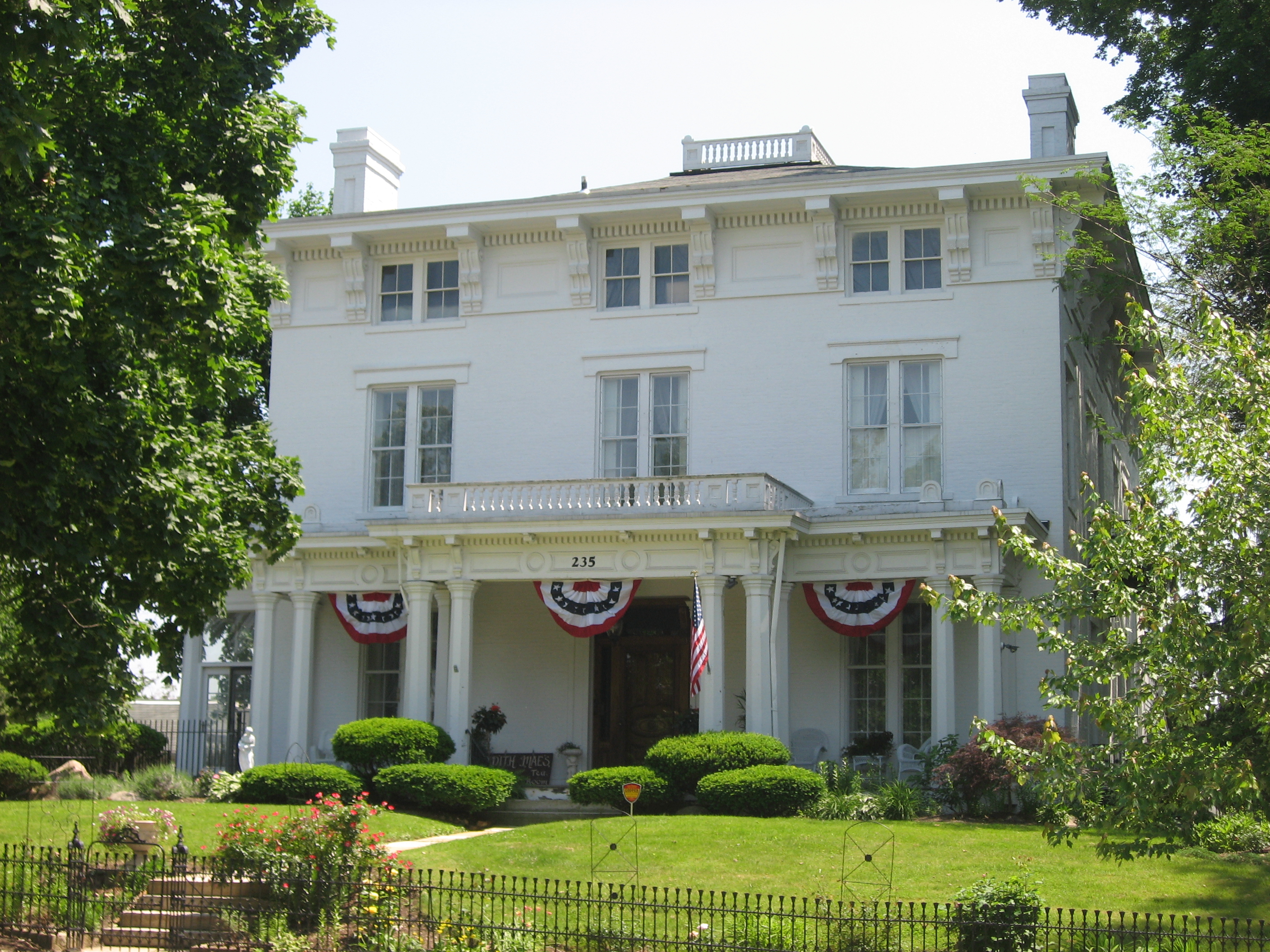
- 235 Second Street

- Location within Ohio Location within the United States
- Location: 235 and 209-213-215 E. 2nd St.; also 184-271 E. 2nd St., Xenia, Ohio
- Coordinates: 39°41′1″N 83°55′31″W
- Area: 2.1 acres (0.85 ha) (original); 2.2 acres (0.89 ha) (increase)
- Architectural style: Italianate, Queen Anne, Late Classic Revival
- NRHP reference No.: 73001451 (original); 79001847 (increase)
- Added to NRHP: March 20, 1973 (original); September 10, 1979 (increase)

The East Second Street Historic District is a historic district in the city of Xenia, Ohio, United States. Created in the 1970s, it comprises a part of what was once one of Xenia's most prestigious neighborhoods.

== Prominent houses ==
Five of the leading houses in the district are located at 183, 204, 209, 235, and 272 East Second:

Xenia's first banker, John Hivling, once lived at 183 Second, which was built circa 1880. Eastlake details on this house include decorations above the door and the windows as well as a round window in the gable. Among the features of the first floor are an entrance on the side and tall sash windows. Built around 1880, 204 Second is a two-story brick building that mixes the Italianate and Eastlake styles. Among its details are decorations over the entryway and its stone lintels. The first residents of 209 Second were the family of John B. Allen, a state representative. A three-story brick building constructed around 1881, it features an elaborate bracketed front porch, three corbelled chimneys, and a two-story side porch.

Abraham Hivling erected 235 Second around 1840. Three stories tall, it features a large front and side porch with an entablature and pillars. Visitors enter through a grand door with sidelights and transom. The interior is divided into forty-two rooms: ten in the basement and thirty-two in the rest of the house. Known as "Eden Hall", this house was later purchased by John Allen and his wife and given to their daughter and son-in-law, Mary and Coates Kinney. A later owner, Evelyn Cozatt, used the property to house a huge antique collection. In the 2000s, it was opened as a bed and breakfast. As of May 2017, it has reverted to a private home.

A Mr. King was the first inhabitant of 272 Second, which was built circa 1885. A banker and industrialist, King operated a munitions plant at the community of Kings Mills. His house is a weatherboarded 2½-story structure in the Queen Anne style; it features an asymmetrical floor plan and multiple large gables. Sidelights and a transom surround the recessed main entrance, and a screened porch is accessible from the second floor.

== Preservation ==
In March 1973, the houses at 209 and 235 Second were designated the East Second Street District and listed on the National Register of Historic Places, and six years later the district was expanded to include part of the 100 block and most of the 200 block. The neighborhood was judged important because of its ability to depict wealthy Gilded Age society and because of the high degree of preservation that the houses have experienced.
