= Xenia, Ohio =

- City
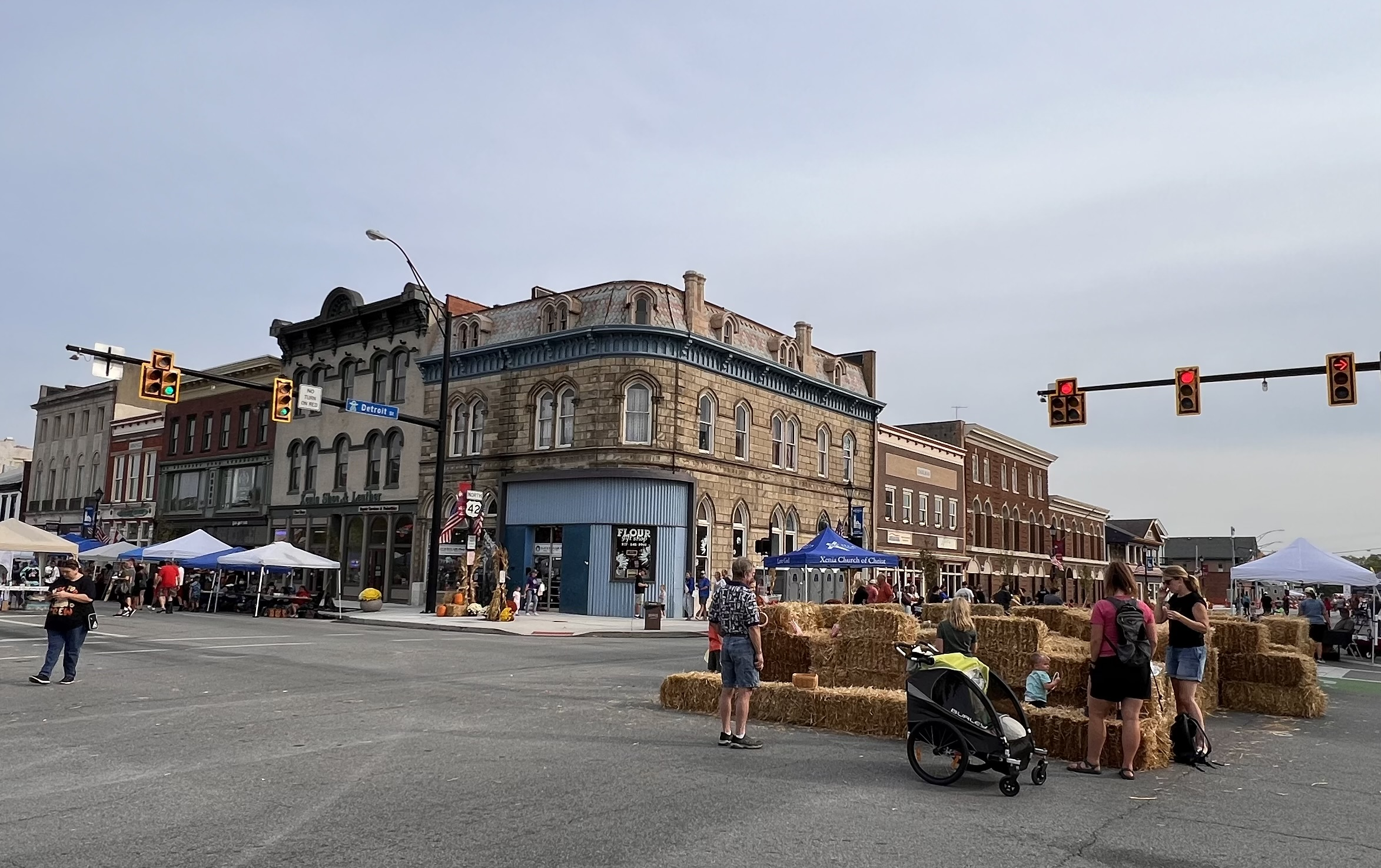
- Downtown Xenia

- Flag Seal Logo
- Nicknames: "City of Hospitality", "Bicycle Capital of the Midwest"
- Motto: "Vivid History, Vibrant Future"
- Interactive map of Xenia, Ohio
- Location within Ohio Location within the United States
- Coordinates: 39°40′58″N 83°56′29″W
- Country: United States
- State: Ohio
- County: Greene
- Founded: 1803; 223 years ago

Government
  - Mayor: Ethan Reynolds
  - City Manager: Brent Merriman

Area
  - Total: 13.08 sq mi (33.87 km^{2})
  - Land: 13.06 sq mi (33.83 km^{2})
  - Water: 0.012 sq mi (0.03 km^{2})
- Elevation: 932 ft (284 m)

Population (2020)
  - Total: 25,441
  - Density: 1,947.6/sq mi (751.99/km^{2})
  - Demonym: Xenian
- Time zone: UTC-5 (Eastern (EST))
  - Summer (DST): UTC-4 (EDT)
- ZIP code: 45385
- Area codes: 937, 326
- FIPS code: 39-86772
- GNIS feature ID: 1086175
- Website: https://www.cityofxenia.org/

Xenia (/ˈziːnjə/ ZEEN-yə) is a city in Greene County, Ohio, United States, and its county seat. Located in southwestern Ohio, it is 15 miles (24 km) east of Dayton and is part of the Dayton metropolitan area as well as the Miami Valley region. As of the 2020 census, the city had a population of 25,441. The city's name comes from the Greek word Xenia (ξενία), which means 'hospitality'.

== History ==
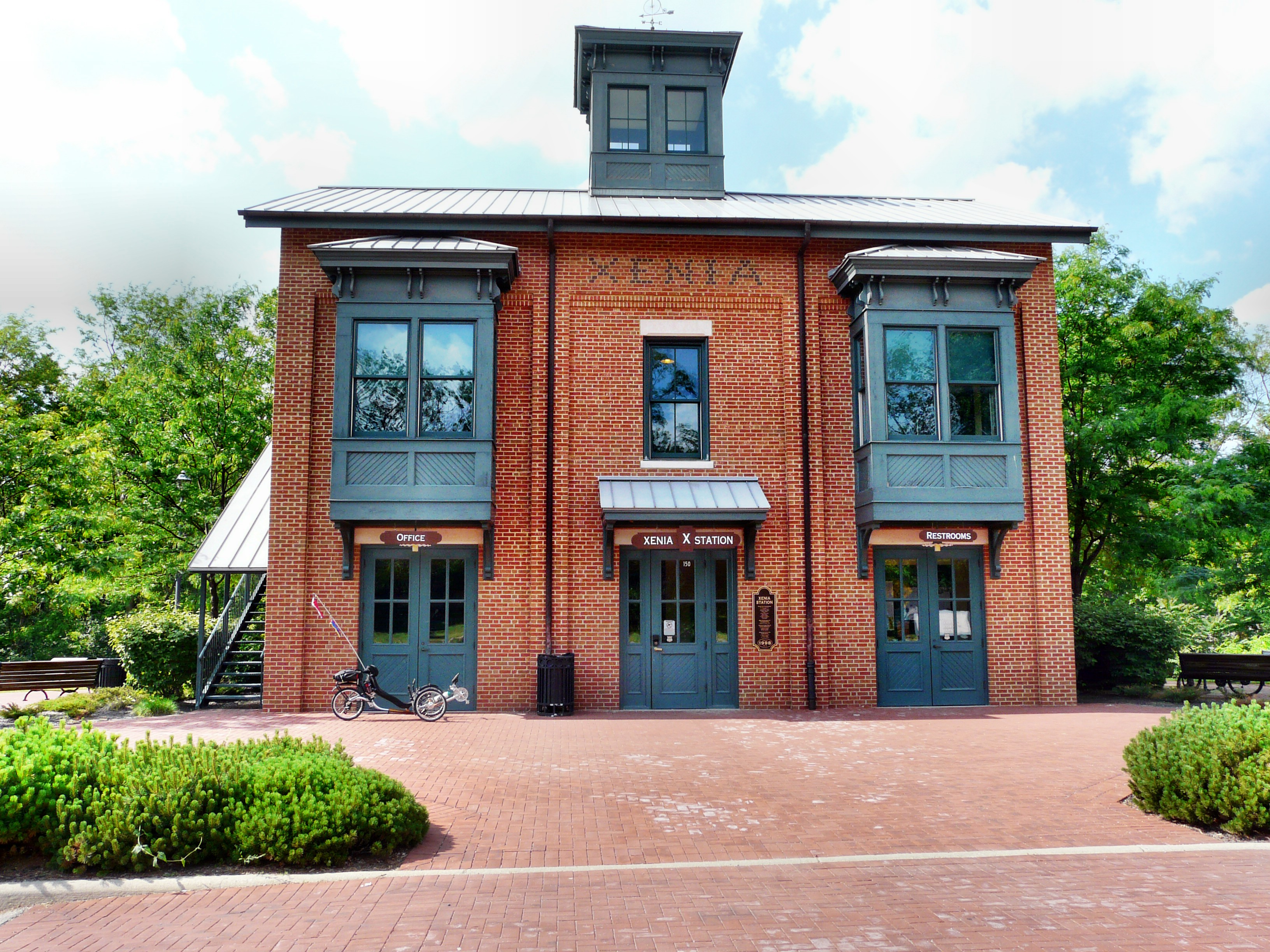
Xenia Station is a replica building based on the original Xenia Station

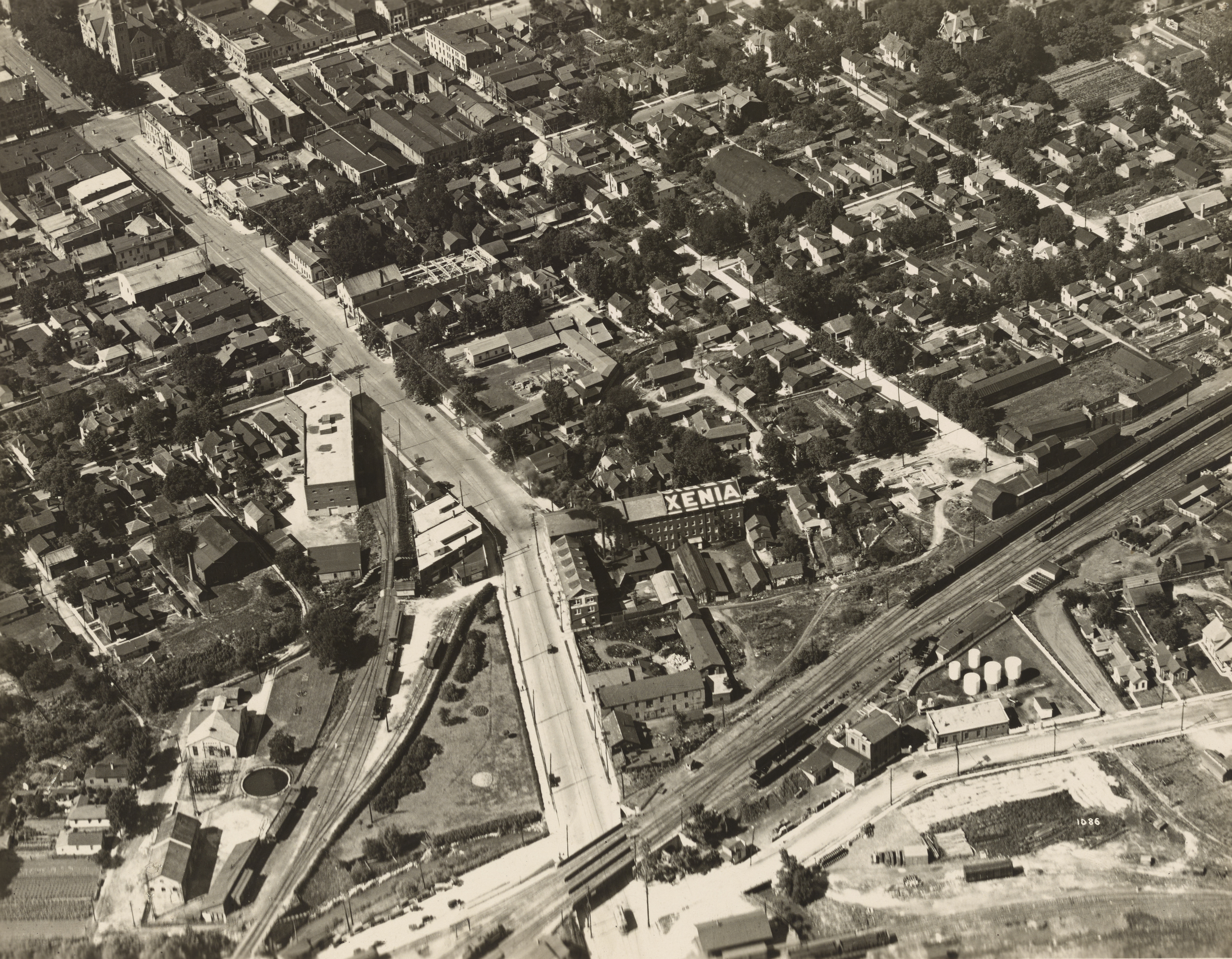
Downtown Xenia in 1930

Xenia was founded in 1803, the same year Ohio was admitted to the Union. In that year, Hollander-American pioneer John Paul bought 2,000 acres (8.1 km^{2}) of land from Thomas and Elizabeth Richardson of Hanover County, Virginia, for "1050 pounds current moneys of Virginia." Paul influenced county commissioners to locate the county seat on this land at the forks of the Shawnee creeks, stimulating development of the settlement here.

Joseph C. Vance was named to survey the site and lay out the town. The following year, he bought the town site of 257 acres (1.04 km^{2}) from John Paul for $250. The name of the new village was chosen in typically democratic fashion. Vance called a town meeting to discuss possible names. The committee had considered several suggestions without reaching any decision. Then the Rev. Robert Armstrong proposed the name "Xenia," meaning "hospitality" in Greek, because of the fine hospitality extended to him in this friendly community. When a tie vote occurred, Laticia Davis, wife of Owen Davis, was invited to cast the deciding ballot. She voted for "Xenia."

The first session of the Ohio General Assembly created Greene County from the Northwest Territory. It took in the homeland of the Shawnee Indians. Their chief tribal village was north of Xenia at Old Chillicothe, now called Old Town. The Shawnee war chief Tecumseh was born there in 1768.

William Beattie was Xenia's first businessman. In 1804, he opened a tavern which became a center of community affairs. In 1804, John Marshall built Xenia's first house. The first log school house was constructed in 1805, and, that same year, the Rev. James Towler became the town's first postmaster. The growing community soon attracted many pioneer industries - flour mills, sawmills, woolen mills, pork packing plants, oil mills, and tow mills.

A petition for incorporation, dated March 24, 1817, was circulated among the 88 households of Xenia, and on July 21, 1817, that petition, containing 66 signatures, was filed with the Court of Common Pleas of Greene County. On October 27, 1817, the petition for incorporation was granted by the Court and Xenia became a municipal corporation.

The arrival of the Little Miami Railroad (now the site of the Little Miami Scenic Trail, which passed through Xenia Station) in 1843, stimulated the development of additional industries and connected the city to other markets. On March 2, 1850, the Ohio General Assembly rode from Columbus, Ohio to Xenia and back on the newly completed Columbus and Xenia Railroad.

From the summer of 1851, tourists would come from Cincinnati, as well as plantations from the South, to visit the nearby Xenia Springs and Tawawa House, a hotel and health spa about three miles away. It was established as a summer resort to draw on interest in the medicinal properties of the springs. Skin specialist Dr. Samuel Spilsbee from Cincinnati served as Superintendent of the hotel. It was three stories high, and the grounds of the complex also included separate cottages. After it went out of business, the complex was purchased for use as Wilberforce University, a historically black college founded by a collaboration between the African Methodist Episcopal Church (AME) and the Cincinnati Conference of the Methodist Church. By 1860 most of the 200 students were mixed-race children of wealthy white fathers from the South, planters and businessmen who were prevented from getting them educated there. In the early years of the war, the college closed briefly after Southerners withdrew their children. The AME Church took it over, and continued to operate it.

On Wednesday morning, February 13, 1861, President-Elect Abraham Lincoln made a brief appearance in the city as his inaugural train traveled from Cincinnati northeast to Columbus. He gave a short speech; the traveling reporter from the New York Times did not record it as Lincoln expressed sentiments that he had repeated in previous stops. According to the Times writer, "a very large crowd assembled, and amid the firing of a cannon and enthusiasm, Mr. Lincoln addressed them from the rear car, reiterating what he had said before.".

The town progressed rapidly during the mid-19th century. Artificial gas was provided in the 1840s, and continued in use until natural gas was made available in 1905. The first fire engine house was built in 1831; the telephone came to Xenia in 1879; electricity in 1881 and a water works system in 1886. Xenia opened its first free public library in 1899. By 1900, the city was operating its own sewage system.

Following the Civil War, the Ohio Soldiers' and Sailors' Orphans' Home was built in Xenia. Some of its building remains in use by a Christian ministry organization.

Xenia elected Cornelius Clark as its first mayor in 1834. On January 1, 1918, the current city commission-manager plan succeeded the old form of municipal government.

=== Tornadoes ===
Xenia has a history of severe storm activity. According to local legend, the Shawnee referred to the area as "the place of the devil wind" or "the land of the crazy winds" (depending upon the translation).

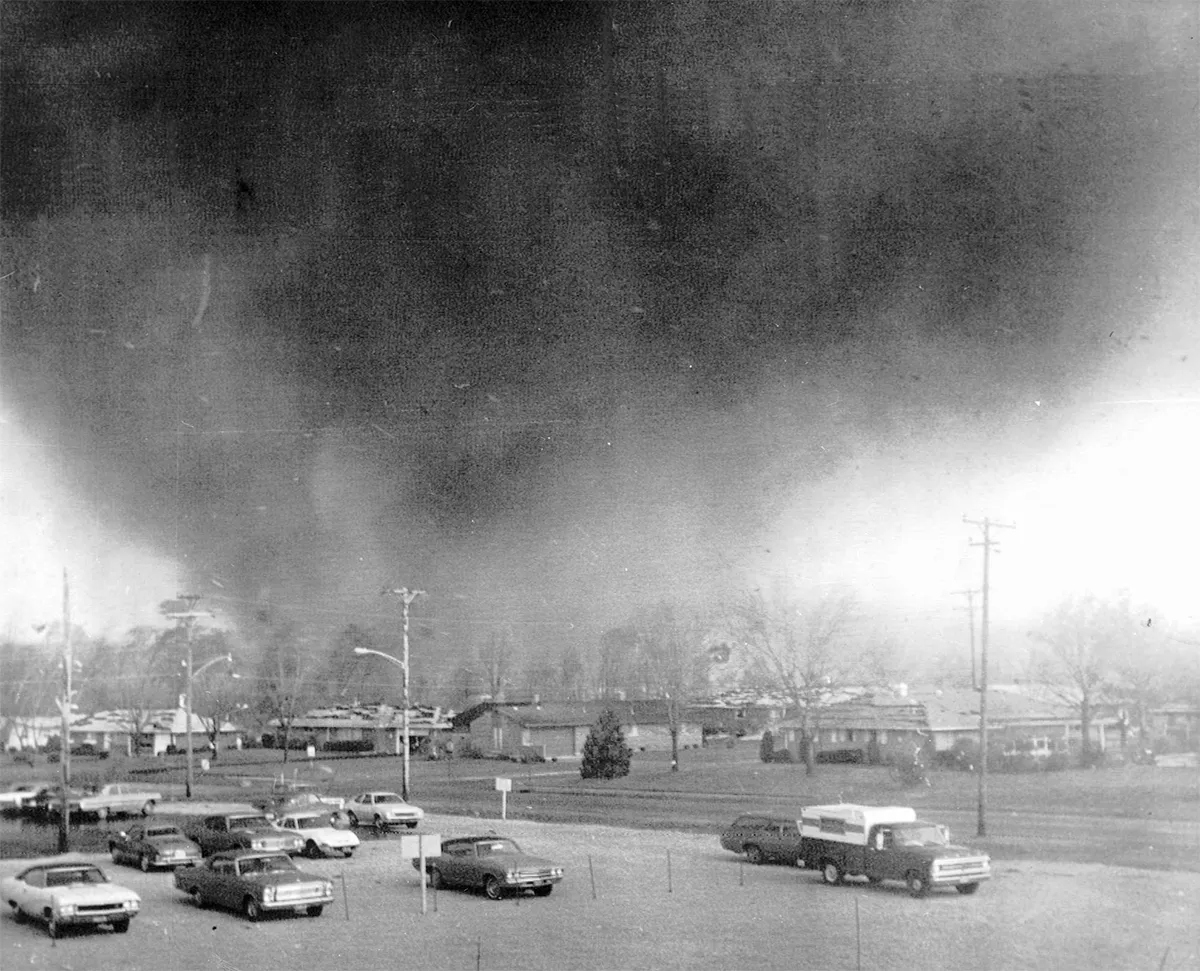
The 1974 Xenia F5 tornado tearing through the southeast Pinecrest Garden district.

On April 3, 1974, a verified F5 rated tornado on the Fujita scale cut a path directly through the middle of Xenia during the 1974 Super Outbreak, the second largest series of tornadoes in recorded history. The disaster killed 34 people (including two Ohio National Guardsmen who died days later in a related fire), injured an additional 1,150, destroyed almost half of the city's buildings, and left 10,000 people homeless. Five schools, including Xenia High School, Central Junior High School, McKinley Elementary, Simon Kenton Elementary, and Saint Brigid Catholic School, were destroyed, as were nine churches and 180 businesses. Ted Fujita himself rated the tornado an F6 in an essay he wrote, but the rating was never confirmed.

The city's plight was featured in the national news, including a 1974 NBC television documentary, Tornado!, hosted by Floyd Kalber. President Richard Nixon visited stricken areas of Xenia following the devastation. Comedian Bob Hope organized a benefit to raise funds for Xenia and, in appreciation, the new Xenia High School Auditorium was named the "Bob Hope Auditorium." In recognition of their coverage of this tornado, the staff of the Xenia Daily Gazette won the Pulitzer Prize for Spot News Reporting in 1975.

Xenia was struck by an F2 tornado on April 25, 1989, and again by an F4 tornado on September 20, 2000. The 1989 tornado caused over $2 million (~$4.39 million in 2024) in damage, but no one was killed. The twister of 2000 killed one person, and injured 100 people. This tornado followed a path roughly parallel to that of the 1974 tornado.

Xenia currently has a system of tornado sirens. After the 1974 tornado outbreak, the city purchased a system of five Federal Signal Thunderbolt sirens for warning. During the 2000 tornado strike, the lack of backup power silenced the Thunderbolts during emergency, so the city purchased five Federal Signal 2001-SRNB series sirens with battery backup to reinforce/replace the Thunderbolts.

=== Railroads ===
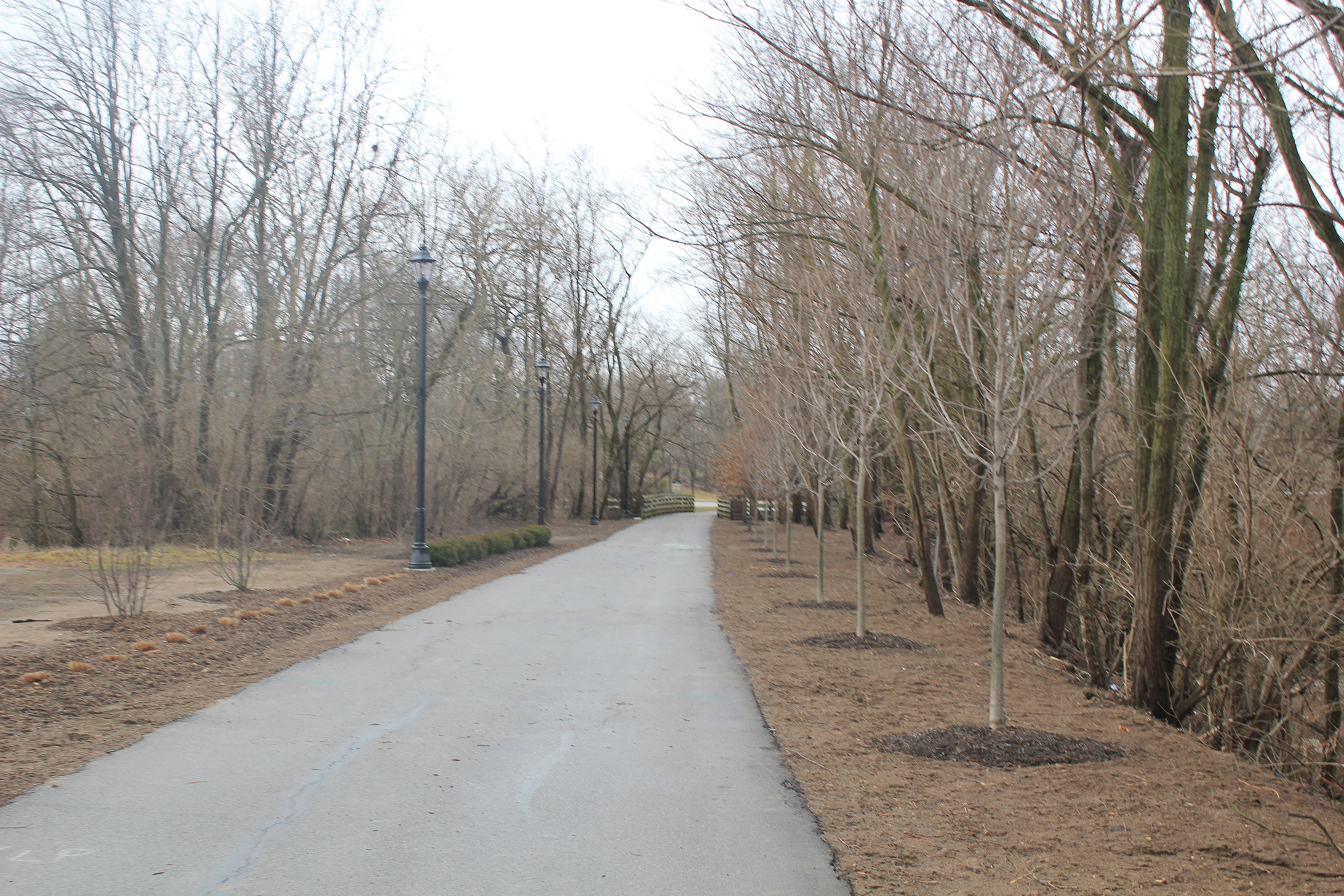
A portion of the Little Miami Scenic Trail in Xenia

Several railroad lines owned by the Baltimore & Ohio (B&O) and Pennsylvania (PRR) railroads once served Xenia, for both freight and passenger service. Since restructuring of the railroad industry in the mid-twentieth century, all lines have since been abandoned, the last being dismantled by 1989.

The lines that previously served Xenia were:

- B&O Wellston subdivision, between Washington Court House and Dayton.
- PRR Little Miami branch, between Cincinnati and Springfield; a portion of the line ran down Detroit Street and was the first section to be dismantled.
- PRR Pittsburgh-St. Louis mainline; Amtrak operated the National Limited passenger service over this line until 1979.

The roadbeds of five of Xenia's six rail lines were converted for rail trail use. The one exception — the B&O line west of town — was not converted because it closely paralleled the PRR mainline for most of its length.

Xenia was served by two interurban railways until the 1940s:

- Dayton & Xenia Transit Company
- Springfield & Xenia Railway

In the postwar period, automobile ownership increased, and the federal government subsidized the construction of numerous interstate highways. Both changes influenced the decline of regional transit, such as the interurban railways.

== Geography ==
Today Xenia is centrally located in the "transportation triangle" formed by three major interstate highways: I-70, I-71, and I-75. These north-south, east–west arteries are within minutes of Xenia via U.S. Routes 35, 42, and 68, tying the community to one of the nation's largest 90-minute highway markets. Before the creation of the U.S. Interstate Highway system, U.S. 68 was one of the main southward routes from the major city of Detroit, Michigan. Within Xenia, U.S. 68 is named "Detroit Street". Xenia's Main Street runs concurrently with Business Route U.S. 35.

According to the United States Census Bureau, the city has a total area of 13.29 square miles (34.42 km^{2}), of which, 13.28 square miles (34.40 km^{2}) is land and 0.01 square miles (0.03 km^{2}) is water.

=== Climate ===
Climate data for Xenia, Ohio (1991–2020 normals, extremes 1916–present)
Month	Jan	Feb	Mar	Apr	May	Jun	Jul	Aug	Sep	Oct	Nov	Dec	Year
Record high °F (°C)	73 (23)	77 (25)	84 (29)	90 (32)	95 (35)	102 (39)	108 (42)	107 (42)	103 (39)	92 (33)	84 (29)	74 (23)	108 (42)
Mean maximum °F (°C)	59.2 (15.1)	63.2 (17.3)	71.7 (22.1)	80.2 (26.8)	85.9 (29.9)	90.2 (32.3)	91.0 (32.8)	89.7 (32.1)	87.7 (30.9)	82.0 (27.8)	70.9 (21.6)	62.3 (16.8)	92.3 (33.5)
Mean daily maximum °F (°C)	37.6 (3.1)	41.7 (5.4)	51.9 (11.1)	64.8 (18.2)	73.4 (23.0)	80.8 (27.1)	83.4 (28.6)	82.2 (27.9)	77.1 (25.1)	66.1 (18.9)	53.3 (11.8)	42.0 (5.6)	62.9 (17.2)
Daily mean °F (°C)	30.2 (−1.0)	33.5 (0.8)	42.7 (5.9)	54.1 (12.3)	63.5 (17.5)	71.4 (21.9)	74.1 (23.4)	72.5 (22.5)	66.6 (19.2)	55.9 (13.3)	44.6 (7.0)	34.9 (1.6)	53.7 (12.1)
Mean daily minimum °F (°C)	22.7 (−5.2)	25.2 (−3.8)	33.6 (0.9)	43.5 (6.4)	53.7 (12.1)	62.0 (16.7)	64.8 (18.2)	62.7 (17.1)	56.1 (13.4)	45.7 (7.6)	35.9 (2.2)	27.9 (−2.3)	44.5 (6.9)
Mean minimum °F (°C)	−1.6 (−18.7)	4.2 (−15.4)	13.1 (−10.5)	25.7 (−3.5)	37.1 (2.8)	48.4 (9.1)	53.3 (11.8)	50.7 (10.4)	40.3 (4.6)	28.5 (−1.9)	19.1 (−7.2)	7.8 (−13.4)	−4.5 (−20.3)
Record low °F (°C)	−28 (−33)	−20 (−29)	−5 (−21)	13 (−11)	25 (−4)	37 (3)	42 (6)	38 (3)	25 (−4)	16 (−9)	−8 (−22)	−24 (−31)	−28 (−33)
Average precipitation inches (mm)	3.39 (86)	2.66 (68)	3.74 (95)	4.56 (116)	4.82 (122)	4.72 (120)	3.98 (101)	3.25 (83)	2.72 (69)	3.10 (79)	3.07 (78)	3.25 (83)	43.26 (1,099)
Average snowfall inches (cm)	7.3 (19)	5.3 (13)	2.6 (6.6)	0.5 (1.3)	0.0 (0.0)	0.0 (0.0)	0.0 (0.0)	0.0 (0.0)	0.0 (0.0)	0.1 (0.25)	0.7 (1.8)	3.8 (9.7)	20.3 (52)
Average precipitation days (≥ 0.01 in)	9.8	8.4	9.2	10.7	11.0	10.3	9.1	7.2	6.2	7.6	8.3	9.1	106.9
Average snowy days (≥ 0.1 in)	3.8	3.3	1.4	0.3	0.0	0.0	0.0	0.0	0.0	0.0	0.6	2.7	12.1
Source: NOAA

== Demographics ==
Historical population
Census	Pop.	Note	%±
1810	429		—
1820	799		86.2%
1830	917		14.8%
1840	1,913		108.6%
1850	3,024		58.1%
1860	4,658		54.0%
1870	6,377		36.9%
1880	7,026		10.2%
1890	7,301		3.9%
1900	8,696		19.1%
1910	8,706		0.1%
1920	9,110		4.6%
1930	10,507		15.3%
1940	10,633		1.2%
1950	12,877		21.1%
1960	20,445		58.8%
1970	25,373		24.1%
1980	24,712		−2.6%
1990	24,664		−0.2%
2000	24,164		−2.0%
2010	25,719		6.4%
2020	25,441		−1.1%
2025 (est.)	26,425		3.9%

=== 2020 census ===
As of the 2020 census, Xenia had a population of 25,441. The median age was 38.6 years. 23.2% of residents were under the age of 18 and 19.0% of residents were 65 years of age or older. For every 100 females there were 91.2 males, and for every 100 females age 18 and over there were 88.0 males age 18 and over.

98.2% of residents lived in urban areas, while 1.8% lived in rural areas.

There were 10,534 households in Xenia, of which 28.4% had children under the age of 18 living in them. Of all households, 39.3% were married-couple households, 19.3% were households with a male householder and no spouse or partner present, and 33.4% were households with a female householder and no spouse or partner present. About 32.4% of all households were made up of individuals and 14.2% had someone living alone who was 65 years of age or older.

There were 11,422 housing units, of which 7.8% were vacant. The homeowner vacancy rate was 1.4% and the rental vacancy rate was 7.2%.

Racial composition as of the 2020 census
Race	Number	Percent
White	20,140	79.2%
Black or African American	2,823	11.1%
American Indian and Alaska Native	92	0.4%
Asian	181	0.7%
Native Hawaiian and Other Pacific Islander	20	0.1%
Some other race	242	1.0%
Two or more races	1,943	7.6%
Hispanic or Latino (of any race)	597	2.3%

=== 2010 census ===
As of the census of 2010, there were 25,719 people, 10,390 households, and 6,631 families residing in the city. The population density was 1,936.7 inhabitants per square mile (747.8/km^{2}). There were 11,424 dwelling units at an average density of 860.2 per square mile (332.1/km^{2}). The racial makeup of the city was 82.0% White, 13.4% African American, 0.4% Native American, 0.5% Asian, 0.5% from other races, and 3.2% from two or more races. Hispanic or Latino of any race were 1.7% of the population.

There were 10,390 households, of which 32.3% had children under the age of 18 living with them, 42.6% were married couples living together, 16.3% had a female householder with no husband present, 4.9% had a male householder with no wife present, and 36.2% were non-families. 31.0% of all households were made up of individuals, and 12.9% had someone living alone who was 65 years of age or older. The average household size was 2.39 and the average family size was 2.98.

The median age in the city was 37.1 years. 24.8% of residents were under the age of 18; 9.1% were between the ages of 18 and 24; 25.6% were from 25 to 44; 24.9% were from 45 to 64; and 15.7% were 65 years of age or older. The gender makeup of the city was 47.2% male and 52.8% female.

=== 2000 census ===
As of the census of 2000, there were 24,164 people, 9,378 households, and 6,527 families residing in the city. The population density was 1,989.3 inhabitants per square mile (768.1/km^{2}). There were 9,924 dwelling units at an average density of 817.0 per square mile (315.4/km^{2}). The racial makeup of the city was 83.30% White, 13.51% African American, 0.34% Native American, 0.29% Asian, 0.05% Pacific Islander, 0.53% from other races, and 1.98% from two or more races. Hispanic or Latino of any race were 1.09% of the population.

There were 9,378 households, out of which 34.2% had children under the age of 18 living with them, 50.2% were married couples living together, 15.5% had a female householder with no husband present, and 30.4% were non-families. 26.2% of all households were made up of individuals, and 11.1% had someone living alone who was 65 years of age or older. The average household size was 2.51 and the average family size was 3.02.

In the city the population was spread out, with 27.1% under the age of 18, 9.6% from 18 to 24, 28.5% from 25 to 44, 21.3% from 45 to 64, and 13.5% who were 65 years of age or older. The median age was 34 years. For every 100 females, there were 90.5 males. For every 100 females age 18 and over, there were 84.4 males.

The median income for a household in the city was $36,457, and the median income for a family was $43,046. Males had a median income of $34,497 versus $24,094 for females. The per capita income for the city was $16,481. About 8.9% of families and 11.6% of the population were below the poverty line, including 14.8% of those under age 18 and 9.4% of those age 65 or over.

== Economy ==
Xenia has, or once had, the following industries:

- Hooven and Allison rope factory (1870–2003)
- Xenia Shoe Manufacturing
- Xenia Ironcasting Foundry (founded 1920)
- Bob Evans Farms meat packing plant
- Xenia Workhouse
- Kroehler Furniture factory (destroyed 1974)
- McDonald Farm Stone Quarry - stone used to represent Ohio in the Washington Monument
- Dodds Monuments - grave and memorial sculptors (founded 1864)
- Eavey Grocers (1865–1970)

== Arts and culture ==
The annual Dayton Hamvention is held at the Greene County Fairgrounds, having been moved from the now closed Hara Arena in Trotwood, Ohio in May 2017. This event typically attracts over 20,000 amateur radio enthusiasts from around the world.

The Industrial Strength Bluegrass Festival launched its first ever outdoor summer festival on July 17–19, 2025, at the Greene County Fairgrounds & Expo Center in Xenia, OH.

== Government ==
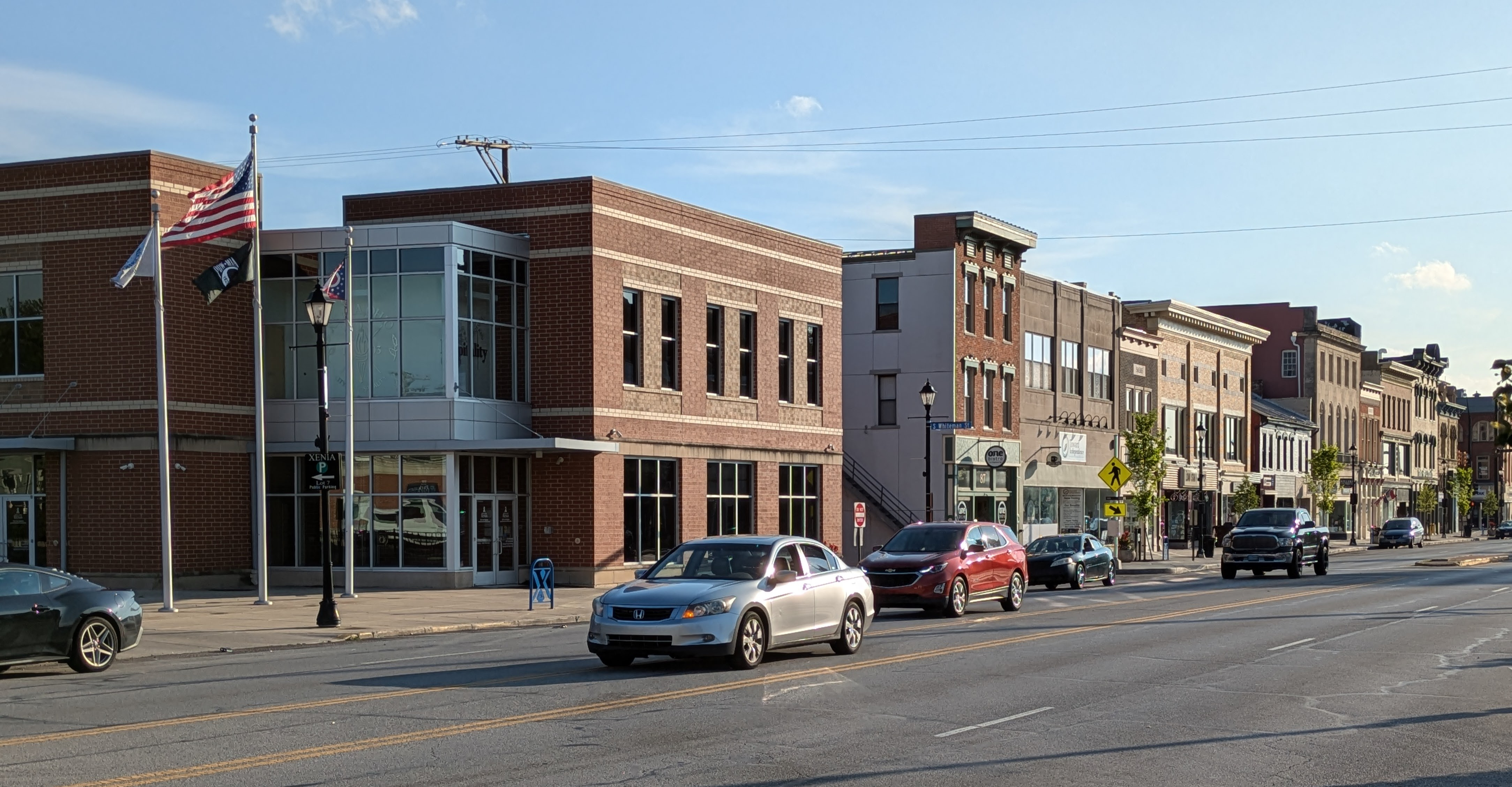
Xenia City Administration Building and Historic East Main St

The Xenia City Council exercises the powers and authority of a municipal corporation as determined by the constitution of the State of Ohio and the Charter and ordinances of the City of Xenia. The City Council is composed of seven elected council members, including one mayor. Council members are each elected for one four-year term of office.

City Council Members

- Mayor Ethan Reynolds
- City Council President Wesley Smith
- Councilman James Crawford
- Councilwoman Rachel Huffman
- Councilman JD Mackiewicz
- Councilwoman Faith Sorice
- Councilman Jesse Rubio

The City Manager is Brent Merriman.

== Education ==
The Xenia Community Schools has 1 preschool, 5 elementary, 1 middle, and 1 high school:

- Xenia Preschool (formerly Central Middle School) (Grade PreK)
- Cox Elementary School (Grade K–5)
- McKinley Elementary School (Grade K–5)
- Arrowood Elementary (Grade K–5)
- Shawnee Elementary (Grade K–5)
- Tecumseh Elementary (Grade K–5)
- Warner Middle School (Grade 6–8)
- Xenia High School (Grade 9–12)
- Spring Hill Elementary (as of 2012 defunct)

Private schools in Xenia:

- Legacy Christian Academy (Grade Pre-K–12)
- St. Brigid School (Grade Pre-K–8)

Xenia has the main branch library and administrative offices of the Greene County Public Library.

== Media ==
Xenia is part of the Dayton media market, the 64th-largest media market in the United States.

=== Newspapers ===
The main newspaper in Xenia is the Xenia Daily Gazette, founded in 1868. The Gazette is published two days a week. A community-based online source, Xenia's Word on the Street, is also available. The larger Dayton Daily News, which covers the entire Dayton metro area, includes a community section for Xenia in both the printed and online versions. In February 2023, it was announced that the Gazette would reduce "the number of printed editions each week while expanding local news coverage" on their website due to inflationary costs.

=== Radio ===
Radio stations based in Xenia:

- 1500 AM WBZI "Real Roots Radio" (simulcasts on F.M. translator 100.3/W262BG)
- 95.3 FM WZLR "The Eagle" (Classic Rock)

== Notable people ==
- Doug Adair, television news anchor and journalist
- Doug Adams, NFL linebacker
- Steve Austria, U.S. Congressman
- Elizabeth Gowdy Baker, painter
- Clarence Belt, racing driver
- Una Mae Carlisle, jazz musician
- Dean Chenoweth, hydroplane and auto racer in Motorsports Hall of Fame of America
- John Barry Clemens, NBA player
- Trent Cole, NFL defensive end
- Lloyd Gearhart, MLB player and scout
- Charley Grapewin, actor
- Caitlin Halligan, lawyer and New York State Court of Appeals judge
- Chris Hero, pro wrestler for WWE and NXT
- Roger Huston, harness race caller
- Roland James, NFL cornerback
- Coates Kinney, lawyer, journalist, and poet
- John Little, U.S. Congressman
- Roger McMurrin, conductor
- Warren K. Moorehead, archaeologist
- Rose Murphy, jazz singer
- Larry D. Nichols, puzzle enthusiast and inventor of Pocket Cube
- Obiwu, poet and author
- Aftab Pureval, Mayor of Cincinnati
- Helen Hooven Santmyer, novelist
- Arthur M. Schlesinger, Sr., historian
- Thomas Taggart, Mayor of Indianapolis and U.S. Senator from Indiana
- Tecumseh, Shawnee Chief during the War of 1812
- Ridgely Torrence, poet
- Sarah A. Worden (1855–1918), painter, art instructor

== In popular culture ==
=== Film ===
- Xenia is the setting for Harmony Korine's film Gummo (1997); the movie was not filmed in Xenia, however, but in Korine's hometown of Nashville, Tennessee.

== See also ==
- Alexander Conner House
- Bank of Xenia
- East Second Street Historic District (Xenia, Ohio)
- Greene County–Lewis A. Jackson Regional Airport
- Hollencamp House
- Millen–Schmidt House
- Ohio Town
- Samuel N. Patterson House
- Xenia (automobile)
- Xenia College
