= Samuel N. Patterson House =

Historic house in Ohio, United States

- U.S. National Register of Historic Places
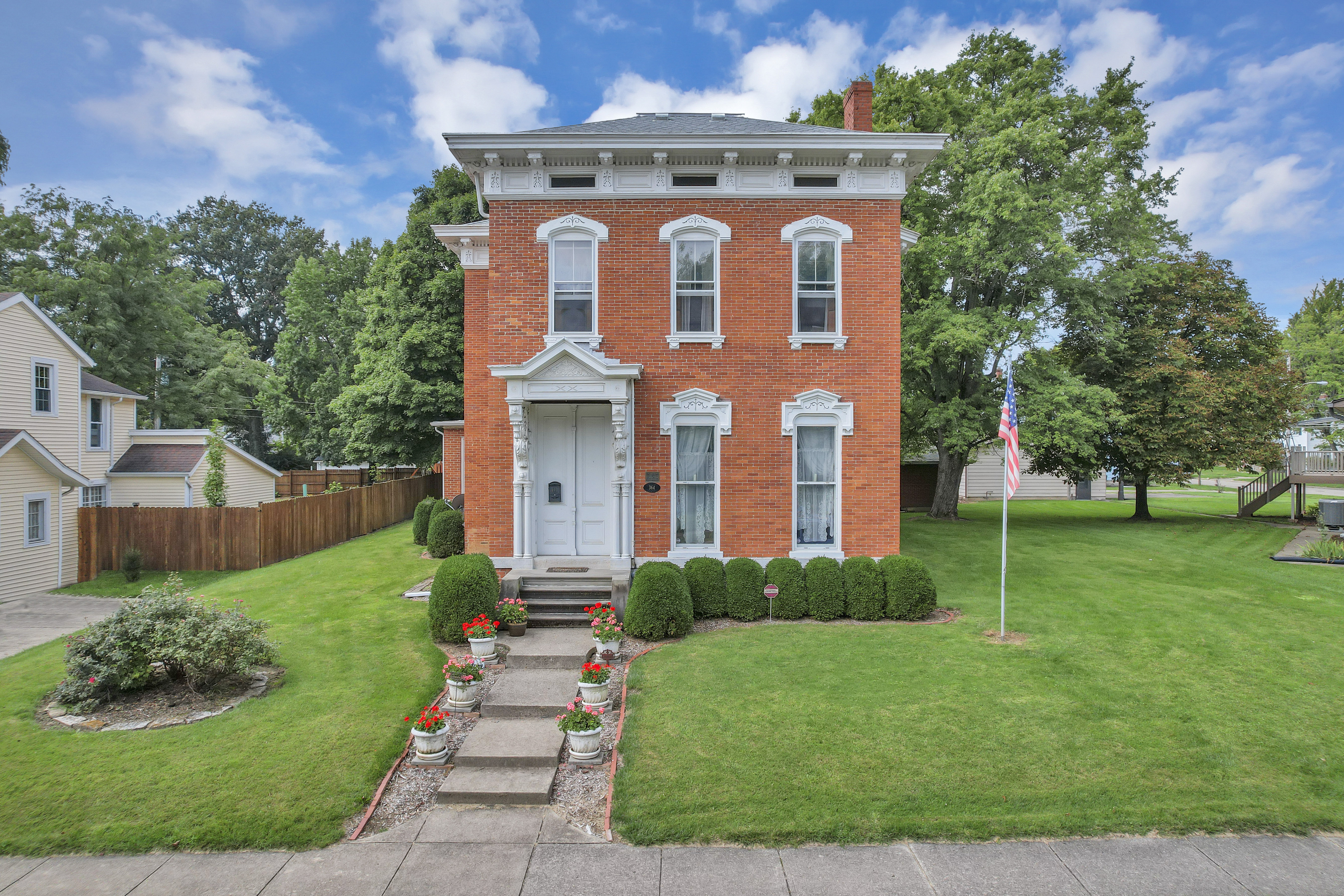

- Location within Ohio Location within the United States
- Location: 364 N. King St, Xenia, Ohio, Ohio
- Coordinates: 39°41′23″N 83°55′56″W
- Area: 0.335 acre
- Built: 1863
- Architect: Samuel N. Patterson
- Architectural style: Italianate
- NRHP reference No.: 76001433
- Added to NRHP: June 3, 1976

The Samuel N. Patterson House is a historic residence in the city of Xenia, Ohio, United States. Built in the 1860s, it was named a historic site in 1976.

== Samuel Patterson ==
Born in 1818, Samuel Patterson moved with his family from Washington, D.C. to Winchester, Ohio when he was four years old. At the age of twenty-eight, he migrated to Xenia, where he became an important local businessman. Although he entered into partnership with another man, Tobias Drees, in the ownership of a local mill, he sought to make himself known as a carpenter. Eventually, Patterson developed a strong reputation for his multiple artistic abilities, including wood carving.

== House ==
Patterson arranged for the construction of his house on the upscale North King Street around 1863.Local newspaper "Xenia Torchlight" states in the April 29th 1863 edition "In the north-west part of the city, Samuel Patterson has his new residence nearly ready for the brick mason". Built of brick with a limestone foundation, the two-story house includes elements of stone and metal. The interior is particularly significant because of elements such as a unique music alcove with decorative woodwork, as well as ornate original walnut and butternut (white walnut) woodwork throughout the house.

== Preservation ==
On 3 April 1974, much of Xenia's near north side was destroyed by one of the worst tornadoes on record. The Patterson House fared better than most; it was severely damaged, but the owner chose to restore it rather than completing the demolition. Two years later, it was listed on the National Register of Historic Places, qualifying because of its historically significant architecture. Another house on North King that survived the tornado, known as the Millen-Schmidt House, is located two blocks to the south; it too was listed on the National Register in 1976.
