= Xenia High School =

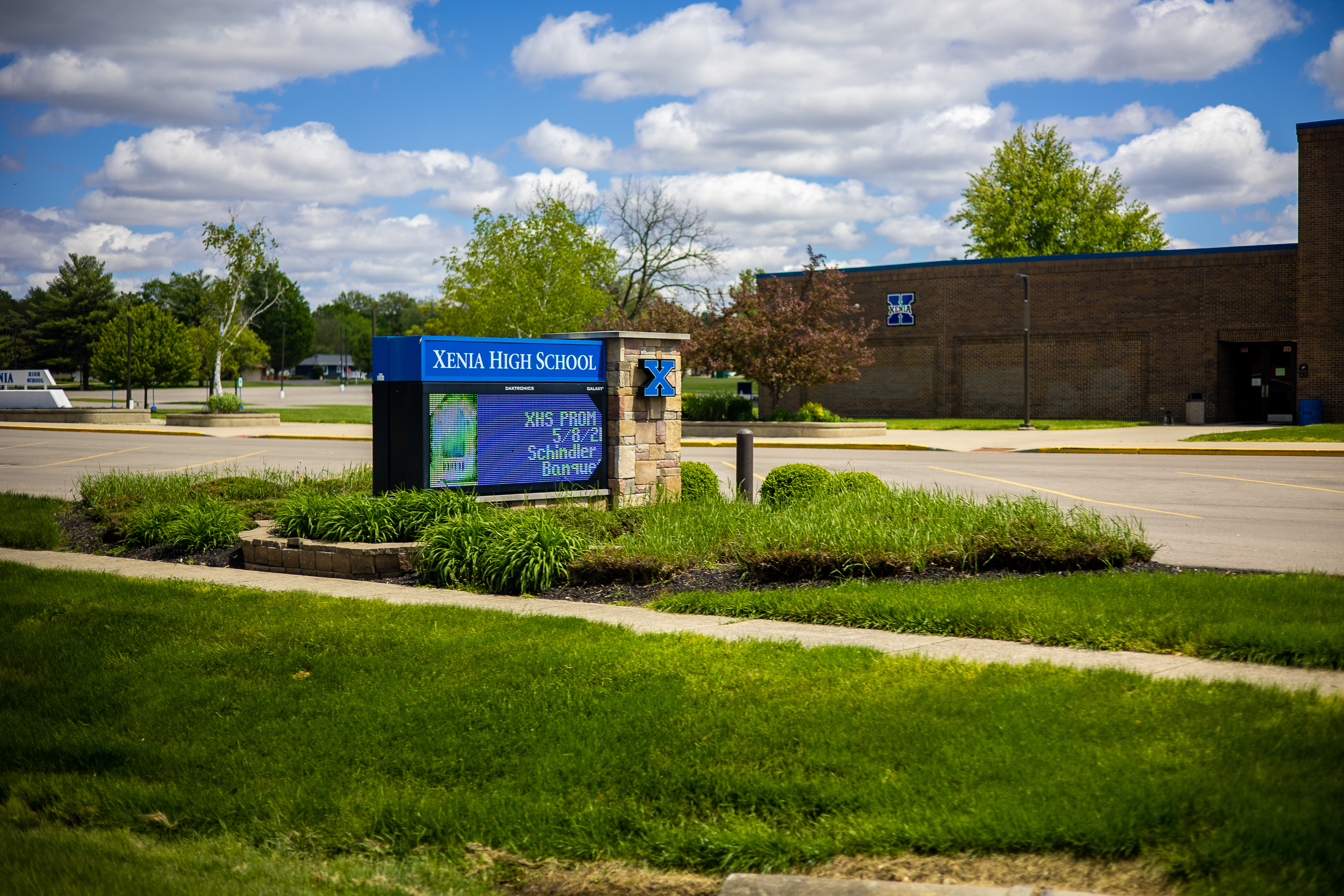

Location
- 303 Kinsey Road; Xenia, Ohio 45385; United States
- Coordinates: 39°42′33″N 83°55′42″W

Information
- Type: Public
- School district: Xenia Community Schools
- Principal: Todd Whalen
- Teaching staff: 54.00 (on an FTE basis)
- Grades: 9–12
- Enrollment: 947 (2023–2024)
- Student to teacher ratio: 17.54
- Colors: Blue and White
- Fight song: "Hurrah for Xenia High School"
- Athletics conference: Miami Valley League
- Nickname: Buccaneers
- Accreditation: North Central Association of Colleges and Schools
- Yearbook: Xenian
- Website: xhs.xeniaschools.org

Xenia High School is a public high school in Xenia, Ohio, United States.

== History ==
The 1957 high school was destroyed by an F5 Tornado on April 3, 1974, during the 1974 Super Outbreak. A replacement building was constructed in the north of the city. Students from the high school and several other schools were relocated to Warner Junior High School for three years until the new school was built.

== Notable alumni ==
- Doug Adams, former professional football player
- Barry Clemens, former professional basketball player
- Trent Cole, former defensive end for the Indianapolis Colts
- Paul Huston, former professional basketball player
- Bret Jones, former professional soccer player
- David Levering Lewis, history professor at New York University and twice winner of the Pulitzer Prize
- Daniel Michalski, track and field athlete

== Sports ==
The school's mascot is the Buccaneer and its colors are blue and white. The school's fight song is "Hoorah for Xenia High School." Jack Harbaugh was the head football coach for one year, in 1966. As of 2019-20, the Bucs are members of the Miami Valley League (MVL).

=== State championships ===
- Boys Basketball – 1942
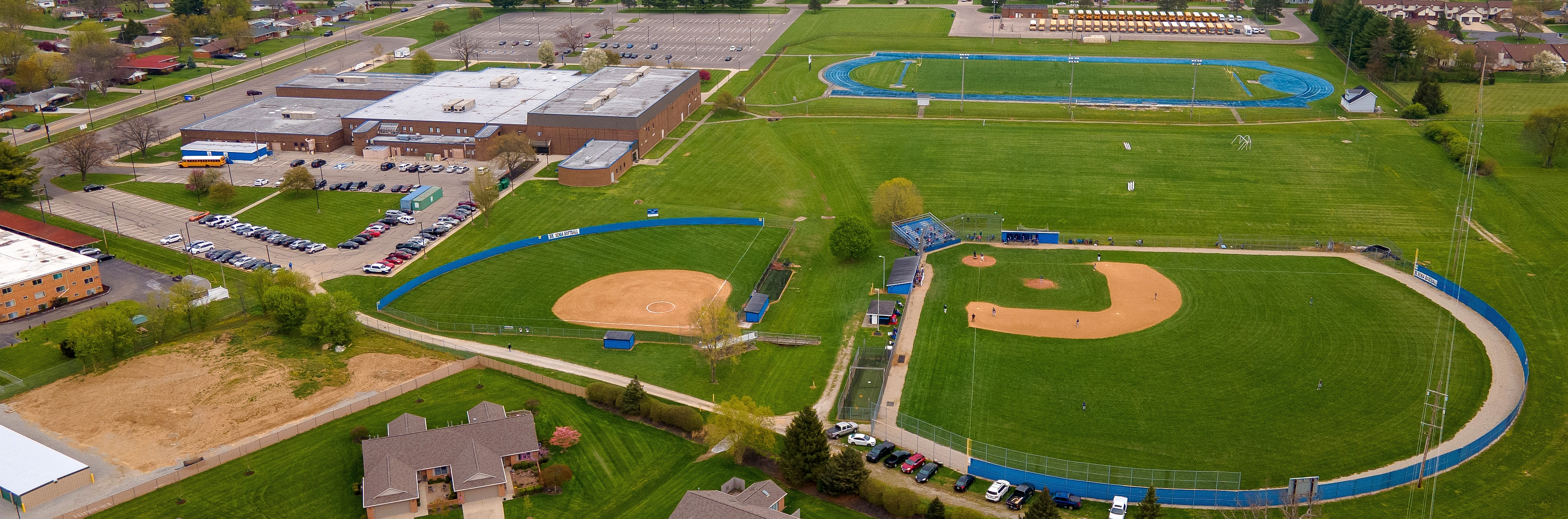
Xenia High School
