= Ohio Town =

1962 book by Helen Hooven Santmyer

- Cover, first edition
- Author: Helen Hooven Santmyer
- Cover artist: P. David Horton
- Language: English
- Genre: Memoir
- Publisher: Ohio State University Press
- Publication date: 1962
- Publication place: United States
- Media type: Print (Hardcover)
- Pages: 309 pp

Ohio Town is a 1962 autobiographical memoir by Helen Hooven Santmyer, describing the places, communities, and some notable people in the Xenia she remembers from her childhood. It is written in mixed first and second person, and the town name itself is never mentioned, except in the "Acknowledgements" small print where Santmyer names helpful sources, including "our paper, the Xenia Daily Gazette".

The book received a limited but favorable reception upon initial publication, and won the 1964 Florence Roberts Head Award. Afterwards it was mostly ignored. After Santmyer became a famous author in 1984, Ohio Town was republished, in hardcover (Harper & Row, 1984) and paperback (Berkley, 1985).

Weldon Kefauver, the managing editor (later director) at OSU Press, described that the very first page of the manuscript of Ohio Town "all but persuaded" him that her writing had "that universality" that explains "the enduring appeal of the world's greatest authors", by turning the ordinary and the mundane into the metaphoric and poetic.

== Reception ==
It is a lively history, pulsating with memories, local lore, and landmarks "as familiar as bread and butter."

— James Iverne Dowie, History News

[It] is a lively account that entices the reader's attention from the first page to the last.

— Eldon C. Hill, Indiana Magazine of History

Santmyer's [book] transcends specific facts but lets the reader step into history

— Sally A. Myers, Northwest Ohio Quarterly
