= List of F5, EF5, and IF5 tornadoes =

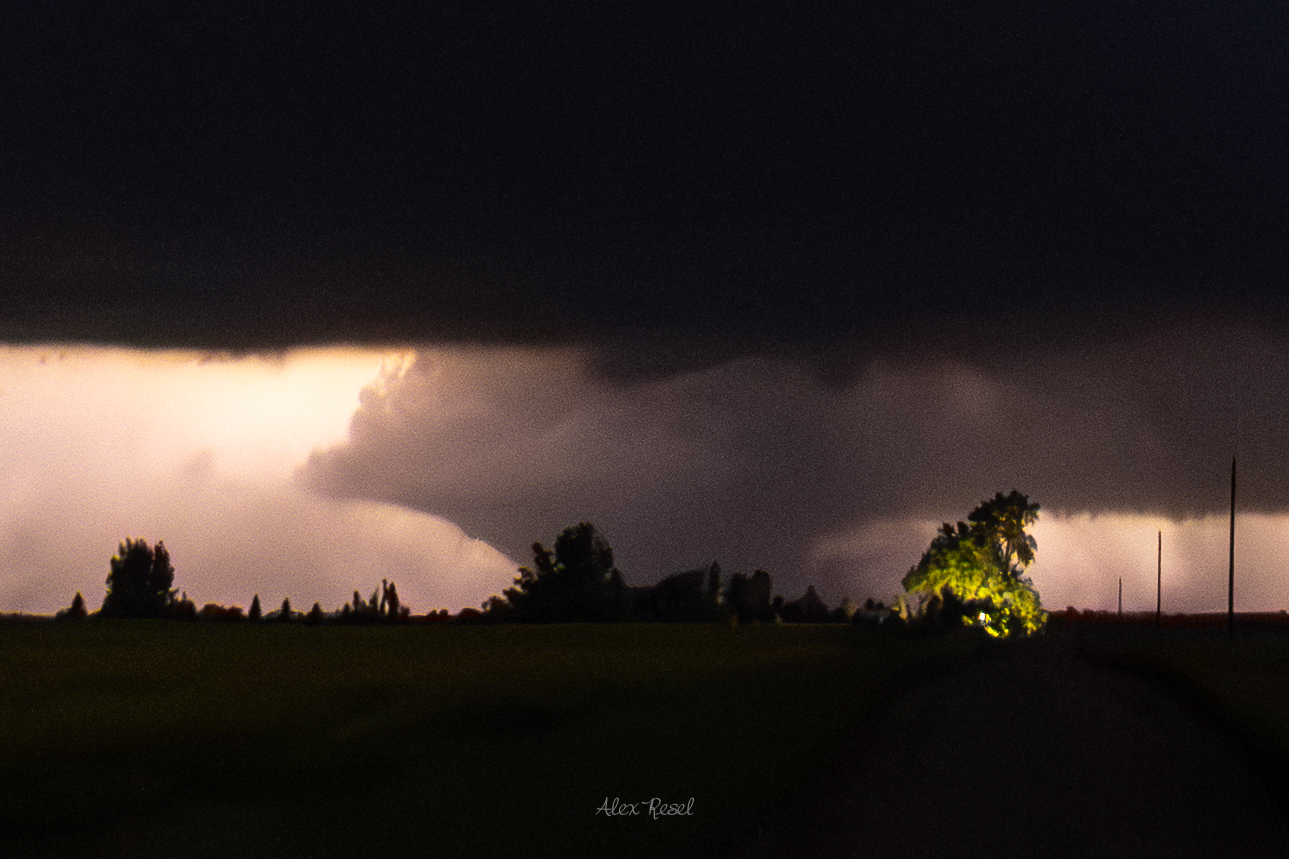
The Enderlin, North Dakota tornado of June 20, 2025, the most recent tornado to receive an EF5 rating.

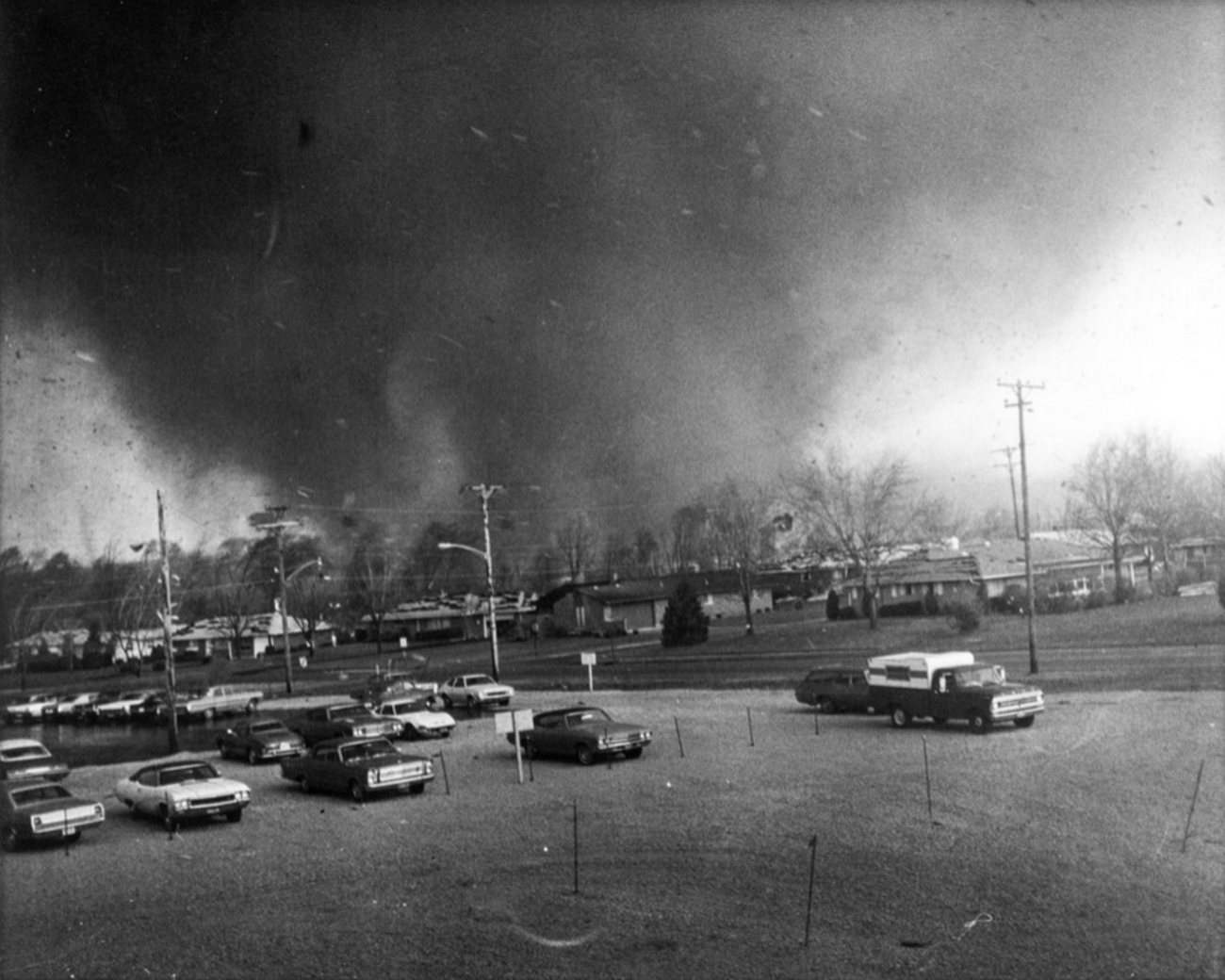
The Xenia, Ohio, F5 tornado of April 3, 1974. Ted Fujita assigned this tornado a preliminary rating of F6 ±1 .

This is a list of tornadoes which have been officially or unofficially labeled as F5, EF5, IF5, T10-T11, the highest possible ratings on the various tornado intensity scales. These scales – the Fujita scale, the Enhanced Fujita scale, the International Fujita scale, and the TORRO tornado intensity scale – attempt to estimate the intensity of a tornado by classifying the damage caused to natural features and man-made structures in the tornado's path. (Note: The Fujita scale was devised under the aegis of scientist T. Theodore Fujita in the early 1970s. Prior to the advent of the scale in 1971, tornadoes in the United States were officially unrated. The Fujita scale has been superseded by the Enhanced Fujita scale in the U.S. since February 1, 2007; Canada used the old scale until April 1, 2013; nations elsewhere, like the United Kingdom, apply other classifications such as the TORRO scale.) (Note: Historically, the number of tornadoes globally and in the United States was and is likely underrepresented: research by Grazulis on annual tornado activity suggests that, as of 2001, only 53% of yearly U.S. tornadoes were officially recorded. Documentation of tornadoes outside the United States was historically less exhaustive, owing to the lack of monitors in many nations and, in some cases, to internal political controls on public information. Most countries only recorded tornadoes that produced severe damage or loss of life. Significant low biases in U.S. tornado counts likely occurred through the early 1990s, when advanced NEXRAD was first installed and the National Weather Service began comprehensively verifying tornado occurrences.)

The most recent EF5 tornado was the 2025 Enderlin tornado, ending the record 12-year EF5 drought that began after the 2013 Moore tornado.

== Background ==
Each year, more than 2,000 tornadoes are recorded worldwide, with the vast majority occurring in the central United States, Europe and South America. In order to assess the intensity of these events, meteorologist Ted Fujita devised a method to estimate maximum wind speeds within tornadic storms based on the damage caused; this became known as the Fujita scale. The scale ranks tornadoes from F0 to F5, with F0 being the least intense and F5 being the most intense. F5 tornadoes were estimated to have had maximum winds between 261 mph (420 km/h) and 318 mph (512 km/h). (Note: The winds estimated by the Fujita scale are estimated values and have not been verified scientifically.)

Following two particularly devastating tornadoes in 1997 and 1999, engineers questioned the reliability of the Fujita scale. Ultimately, a new scale was devised that took into account 28 different damage indicators; this became known as the Enhanced Fujita scale. The Enhanced Fujita scale is used predominantly in North America. Most of Europe, on the other hand, uses the TORRO tornado intensity scale (or T-Scale), which ranks tornado intensity between T0 and T11; F5/EF5 tornadoes are approximately equivalent to T10 to T11 on the T-Scale.

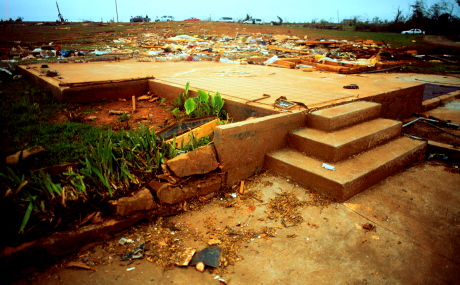
F5 damage in Bridge Creek, Oklahoma, from the May 3, 1999, tornado.

In the United States, between 1950 and January 31, 2007, a total of 50 tornadoes were officially rated F5, and since February 1, 2007, a total of 10 tornadoes have been officially rated EF5. Since 1950, Canada has had one tornado officially rated an F5. Outside the United States and Canada, 11 tornadoes have been officially rated F5/EF5/IF5: three in Italy, two each in France and Germany, and one each in Argentina, Australia, the Netherlands and Paraguay.

Several other tornadoes have also been documented as possibly attaining this status, though they are not officially rated as such. The work of tornado expert Thomas P. Grazulis revealed the existence of several dozen likely F5 tornadoes between 1880 and 1995. Grazulis also called into question the ratings of several tornadoes currently rated F5 by official sources. Many tornadoes officially rated F4/EF4 or equivalent have been disputed and described as actual F5/EF5/T10+ or equivalent tornadoes, and vice versa; since structures are completely destroyed in both cases, distinguishing between an EF4 tornado and an EF5 tornado is often very difficult. Additionally, because tornado ratings are damage-based, many tornadoes capable of causing F5/EF5/T10+ damage, such as those that move through rural areas, may receive lower ratings because their strongest winds do not strike any suitable damage indicators.

=== Research in the 2020s ===
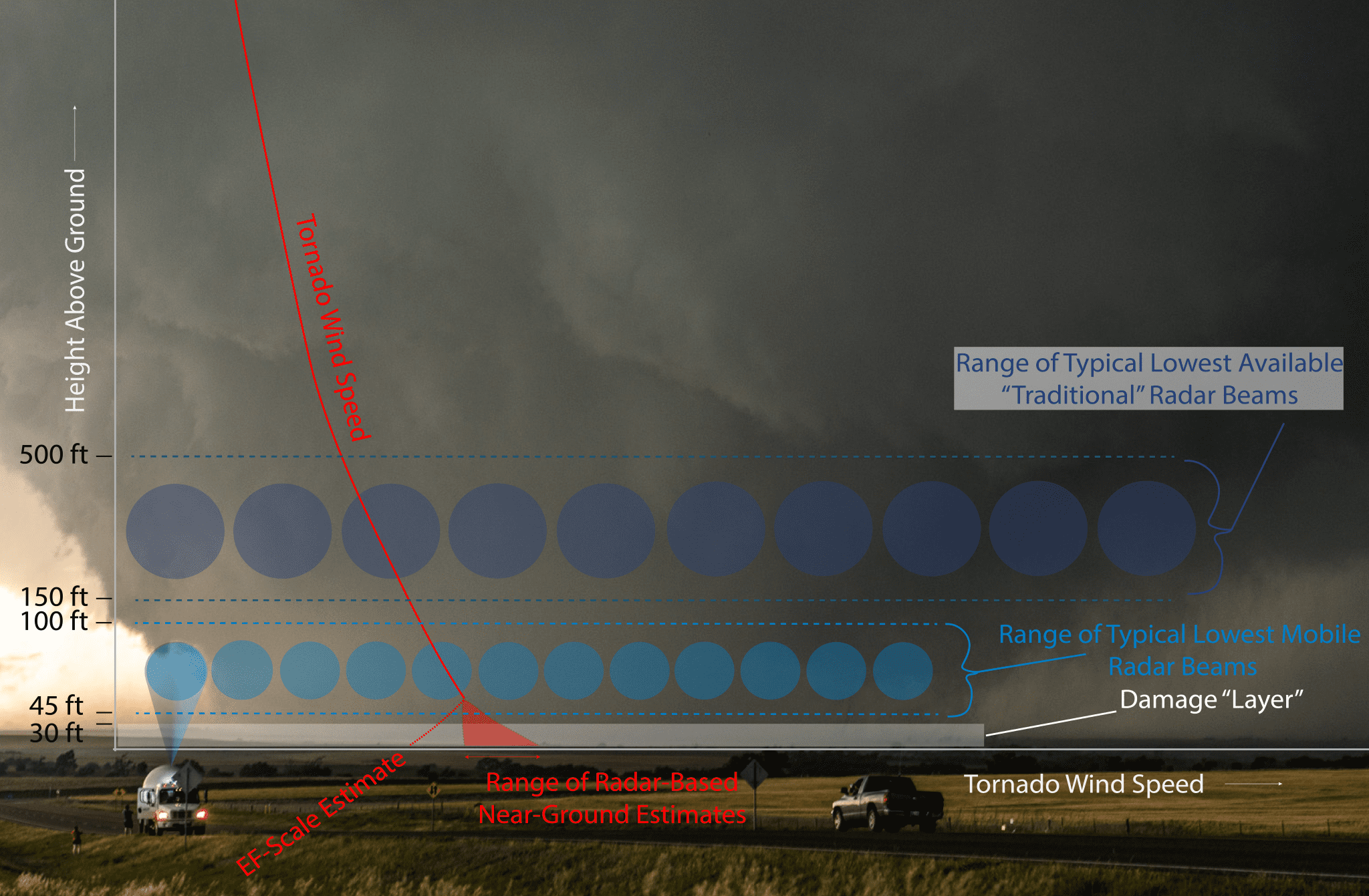
An illustration of where traditional and mobile radars usually scan a tornado or its parent circulation relative to where damage occurs, superimposed on the Custer City, Oklahoma tornado of May 19, 2024.

In July 2023, the International Fujita scale (IF-scale) was officially published, creating a new scale which improved on issues from the Fujita and Enhanced Fujita scales.

In March 2024, Anthony W. Lyza, Matthew D. Flournoy, and A. Addison Alford, researchers with the National Severe Storms Laboratory, Storm Prediction Center, CIWRO, and the University of Oklahoma's School of Meteorology, published a paper stating, ">20% of supercell tornadoes may be capable of producing EF4–EF5 damage".

In May 2024, researchers with the University of Western Ontario's Northern Tornado Project and engineering department conducted a case study on the 2018 Alonsa EF4 tornado, the 2020 Scarth EF3 tornado, and the 2023 Didsbury EF4 tornado. In their case study, the researchers assessed extreme damage caused by the tornado which is ineligible for ratings on the Canadian Enhanced Fujita scale or the American Enhanced Fujita scale (EF-scale). In their analysis, it was determined all three tornadoes caused damage well-beyond their assigned EF-scale ratings, with all three tornadoes having EF5-intensity winds. At the end of the analysis, the researchers stated, "the lofting wind speeds given by this model are much higher than the rating based on the ground survey EF-scale assessment. This may be due to the current tendency to bias strong EF5 tornadoes lower than reality, or limitations in conventional EF-scale assessments".

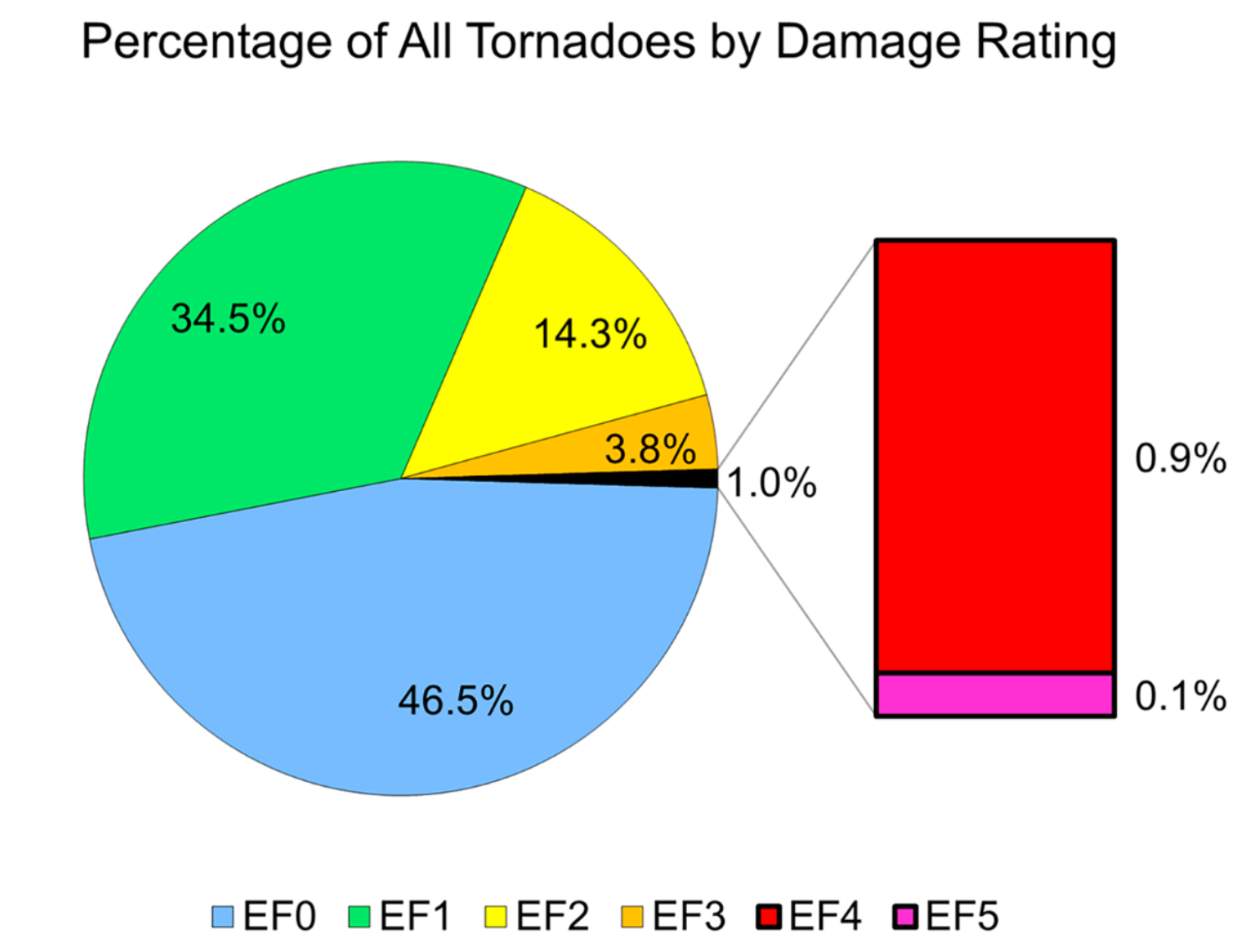
A chart by Villanova University in 2025 showing EF5 tornadoes are responsible for 0.1% of all tornadoes

However this study also lists a significant limitation to their estimation of wind speed data stating "Notably, the current lift coefficients for vehicles used in this study are based on a purely horizontal wind speed, which generates a lift due to the difference in pressure created on the roof of the vehicle to the undercarriage below the vehicle as the surrounding air moves through it. Therefore, there is a current disconnect in the lift coefficients used for the vehicles in this study and the likely physics causing the initiation of lofting for these objects in a tornadic wind field. It seems likely that more realistic coefficients may decrease the lofting wind speed."

== List of events ==
F5 and EF5 Tornadoes in the United States 1950–2019 Detailed map

The tornadoes on this list have been formally rated F5 by an official government source. Unless otherwise noted, the source of the F5 rating is the U.S. National Weather Service (NWS), as shown in the archives of the Storm Prediction Center (SPC) and National Climatic Data Center (NCDC).

Prior to 1950, assessments of F5 tornadoes are based primarily on the work of Thomas P. Grazulis. The NCDC has accepted 38 of his F5 classifications of tornadoes occurring between 1880 and 1950. In addition to the accepted ones, Grazulis rated a further 25 during the same period which were not accepted. Grazulis' work has identified 16 additional F5 tornadoes between 1950 and 1995, with four later being accepted by the NCDC. From 1950 to 1970, tornadoes were assessed retrospectively, primarily using information recorded in government databases, as well as newspaper photographs and eyewitness accounts. Beginning in 1971, tornadoes were rated by the NWS using on-site damage surveys.

As of February 1, 2007, tornadoes in the United States are rated using the Enhanced Fujita scale, which replaced the Fujita scale in order to more accurately correlate tornadic intensity with damage indicators and to augment and refine damage descriptors. No earlier tornadoes will be reclassified on the Enhanced Fujita scale, and no new tornadoes in the United States will be rated on the original Fujita scale. France and Canada also adopted the EF-Scale in subsequent years. The ESSL has been reclassifying older tornado events since the creation of the new International Fujita Scale in 2018, resulting in 5 tornadoes being updated from F5 to IF5.

=== Official F5/EF5/IF5 tornadoes ===
Worldwide, a total of 72 tornadoes have been officially rated F5/EF5/IF5: 60 in the United States, three in Italy, two each in France, and Germany, and one each in Argentina, Australia, Canada, the Netherlands, and Paraguay. Of the 60 tornadoes in the United States, 50 are officially rated F5 on the original Fujita scale (with dates of occurrence between May 11, 1953, and May 3, 1999), and 10 are officially rated EF5 on the Enhanced Fujita scale (with dates of occurrence between May 4, 2007, and June 20, 2025).

In total worldwide, 56 of these tornadoes have been rated F5, 10 have been rated EF5, and eight have been rated IF5. Two have been simultaneously rated EF5 and IF5. For simplicity, they are listed under IF5.

==== F5 tornadoes ====
Tornadoes officially rated F5
Day	Year	Country	Subdivision	Location	Fatalities	Rated by
Feb 16	1876	Australia	Queensland	Bowen	1	BoM
1876 Bowen tornado – A tornado struck near the city of Bowen. In the Bureau of Meteorology (BoM) database, the tornado is marked as striking present-day Brisbane; however, local papers confirmed the tornado caused "a large amount of damage" to Bowen.
Sep 20	1926	Paraguay	Itapúa	Encarnación	300–500	Balbi, Barbieri, Atlinger de Schwarzkopf
1926 Encarnación tornado – A large and deadly tornado moved through Encarnación, causing catastrophic damage to the town and killing more than 300 people, making it the deadliest tornado in South America. Its intensity was estimated at F4 or F5 until it received an official F5 rating in 2017 alongside the San Justo tornado.
May 11	1953	United States	Texas	Lorena, Hewitt, Waco, Bellmead	114	SPC-NWS, NCDC, Grazulis
1953 Waco tornado – This was the first officially-ranked F5 tornado in the United States. Homes outside Waco sustained F5-level damage. Large, multi-story buildings collapsed in downtown Waco but incurred sub-F5-level damage.
May 29	1953	United States	North Dakota	Fort Rice	2	SPC-NWS, NCDC, Grazulis
1953 Fort Rice tornado – A large church was leveled and its pews were driven 4 ft (1.2 m) into the ground. Parts of a car were carried for 1/2 mi (0.80 km). The tornado was initially rated F4 by Grazulis, but he subsequently upgraded it to F5.
Jun 8	1953	United States	Michigan	Flushing Township, Mount Morris Township, Beecher, Genesee Township	116	SPC-NWS, NCDC, Grazulis
1953 Flint-Beecher tornado – Entire blocks of homes were completely swept away, with only rows of bare slabs and empty basements remaining. Cycloidal ground scouring occurred as well. Some victims were mutilated or dismembered.
Jun 27	1953	United States	Iowa	Anita, Adair	1	SPC-NWS, NCDC, Grazulis
Tornado outbreak of June 27, 1953 – One farm was obliterated. Heavy machinery was thrown for more than 100 yd (91 m).
Dec 5	1953	United States	Mississippi	Vicksburg	38	SPC-NWS, NCDC
1953 Vicksburg tornado – "Very frail" homes were leveled. Grazulis rated this tornado as an F4.
May 25	1955	United States	Oklahoma, Kansas	Blackwell (OK)	20	SPC-NWS, NCDC, Grazulis
1955 Blackwell tornado – Many homes were swept away in town.
May 25	1955	United States	Oklahoma, Kansas	Udall	80	SPC-NWS, NCDC, Grazulis
1955 Udall tornado – Nearly every structure in Udall was leveled. Vehicles were thrown and stripped down to their frames, including a pickup truck that was partially wrapped around a tree. A 30-by-40-foot (9.1 by 12.2 m) concrete block building was obliterated, with the foundation left mostly bare. Numerous trees were debarked as well.
Apr 3	1956	United States	Michigan	Hudsonville, Grand Rapids	18	SPC-NWS, NCDC, Grazulis
1956 Hudsonville tornado – Many homes and businesses were swept completely away, leaving bare foundations behind. Extensive wind-rowing of debris was observed and vehicles were tossed hundreds of yards as well. One home that was swept away had all of its tile flooring scoured from the foundation. Grazulis initially listed this tornado as an F4 but noted that it "probably produced F5 damage"; he subsequently upgraded it to F5.
May 20	1957	United States	Kansas, Missouri	Spring Hill (KS), Kansas City (MO)	44	SPC-NWS, NCDC, Grazulis
1957 Ruskin Heights tornado – Entire rows of homes were swept away, with extensive wind-rowing of structural debris noted in nearby fields. Some homes had their subfloors swept away as well, leaving only empty basements behind. A school was partially leveled and many shops and businesses sustained F5 damage. Homes were leveled in both states, but F5-level damage occurred to both homes and stores in Missouri, chiefly the neighborhoods of Martin City, Ruskin Heights, and Hickman Mills.
Jun 20	1957	United States	North Dakota, Minnesota	Fargo (ND), Moorhead (MN)	10	SPC-NWS, NCDC, Grazulis, Fujita
Fargo tornado – Homes in the newest part of Fargo were leveled, some of which were swept away. Part of the Golden Ridge subdivision was scattered long distances into nearby fields. Fujita considered this more intense than the strongest tornadoes he surveyed from April 11, 1965.
Dec 18	1957	United States	Illinois	Sunfield	3	SPC-NWS, NCDC, Grazulis
1957 Sunfield tornado – The entire Sunfield community "vanished".
Jun 4	1958	United States	Wisconsin	Menomonie, Colfax	21	SPC-NWS, NCDC, Grazulis
1958 Colfax tornado – Homes were swept away and numerous trees were completely debarked. A baby was thrown 300 ft (91 m) into a ditch and a car was wrapped around the side of a small steel bridge that collapsed in the tornado. Grazulis initially rated this as an F4, but later upgraded it to F5.
May 5	1960	United States	Oklahoma	Prague, Iron Post, Sapulpa	5	SPC-NWS, NCDC, Grazulis
1960 Prague–Sapulpa tornado – Homes were swept away between Prague and Paden, at Iron Post and at the northwest edge of Sapulpa.
Apr 3	1964	United States	Texas	Wichita Falls	7	SPC-NWS, NCDC, Grazulis
1964 Wichita Falls tornado – Two homes adjacent to each other were swept away at F5 intensity and a boxcar was thrown 100 yd (91 m). A car was thrown a block and a half.
May 5	1964	United States	Nebraska	Bradshaw	4	SPC-NWS, NCDC, Grazulis
1964 Central Nebraska tornado – Numerous farms were swept away.
May 8	1965	United States	South Dakota	Colome	1	SPC-NWS, NCDC, Grazulis
1965 Colome tornado – Many farms were destroyed, including three that were swept completely away.
Mar 3	1966	United States	Mississippi	Jackson, Flowood, Leesburg, Forkville, Midway	57	SPC-NWS, NCDC, Grazulis
1966 Jackson, Mississippi tornado – Homes were swept away and a brick church was obliterated. The pavement was scoured from roads and cars were thrown more than 1/2 mi (0.80 km) from where they originated. The newly built Candlestick Park shopping center was leveled and concrete masonry blocks were scattered for long distances. Steel girders were "twisted like wet noodles" at a glass plant.
Jun 8	1966	United States	Kansas	Topeka	16	SPC-NWS, NCDC, Grazulis
1966 Topeka tornado – Entire rows of homes were swept away and grass was scoured from lawns. Eight homes incurred F5-level damage on Burnett's Mound, disproving a myth that the mound protected Topeka from tornadoes.
Oct 14	1966	United States	Iowa	Belmond	6	SPC-NWS, NCDC
1966 Belmond tornado – A house was swept away on the outskirts of town. On this basis, the tornado was officially rated F5, however, the home was likely poorly anchored as debris was deposited in a neat pile near the foundation and nearby homes only showed F1-level damage. Grazulis rated this tornado as an F4.
Apr 23	1968	United States	Ohio	Wheelersburg, Gallipolis	7	SPC-NWS, NCDC
1968 Wheelersburg tornado – Homes were swept away with only their foundations left in some cases. A large metal electrical transmission tower was ripped off at the base and thrown. The F5 rating is disputed as structures swept away were not anchored properly. Grazulis rated this tornado as an F4.
May 15	1968	United States	Iowa	Charles City	13	SPC-NWS, NCDC, Grazulis
1968 Charles City tornado – Many homes and farms were leveled or swept away. Very intense, cycloidal ground scouring associated with multiple vortices was noted.
May 15	1968	United States	Iowa	Oelwein, Maynard	5	SPC-NWS, NCDC, Grazulis
1968 Oelwein–Maynard tornado – Homes were swept completely away in both towns.
Jun 13	1968	United States	Minnesota	Tracy	9	SPC-NWS, NCDC, Grazulis
1968 Tracy tornado – Several businesses, farms, and homes were swept completely away. A heavy boxcar was thrown more than a full block and two others were thrown 300 yd (270 m). A steel I-beam was carried for 2 mi (3.2 km) on a piece of roof. Extensive ground scouring occurred as well.
May 11	1970	United States	Texas	Lubbock	26	SPC-NWS, NCDC, Grazulis, Fujita
Lubbock tornado – Homes were swept away at F5 intensity and trees were almost completely debarked. A high-rise building suffered structural deformation, a 13-ton (26,000 lb; 12,000 kg) metal fertilizer tank was thrown nearly 1 mi (1.6 km) through the air, and large oil tanks were carried for over 300 yd (270 m); however, none of these cases were deemed to have the required winds of F5 intensity. This tornado was surveyed by Fujita and individual cases of damage in Lubbock were used as guidelines for the newly created Fujita scale. This tornado was originally rated F6 but was later downgraded to F5.
Feb 21	1971	United States	Louisiana, Mississippi	Delhi (LA), Waverly (LA), Delta City (MS), Inverness (MS), Moorhead (MS)	47	SPC-NWS, NCDC, Grazulis
1971 Inverness tornado – This was the sole F5 tornado on record in Louisiana. Numerous small homes were completely leveled in both states, but the only official F5 damage occurred in Louisiana as damage in Mississippi only reached F4-level intensity. Grazulis originally rated this tornado as an F4 but later upgraded it to F5.
Jan 10	1973	Argentina	Santa Fe Province	San Justo	63	Balbi, Barbieri, de Schwarzkopf, Grazulis
1973 San Justo tornado – Masonry homes reportedly vanished with little or no trace and vehicles were thrown hundreds of meters and mangled beyond recognition. Large factories were completely leveled and grass was scoured from the ground. A vehicle motor was found embedded into a poured concrete wall and a tractor was thrown 500 m (1,600 ft) into a wooded area. This slow-moving tornado was not officially rated until 2017.
May 6	1973	United States	Texas	Valley Mills	0	SPC-NWS, NCDC, Grazulis, Fujita
1973 Valley Mills tornado – This tornado was rated F5 by wind engineers on the basis of vehicles being carried long distances. Two pickup trucks were lofted for hundreds of yards, one of which traveled 1/2 mi (0.80 km) through the air. Peak structural damage was only of F2 intensity as two rural barns were obliterated. The F5 rating was accepted by Fujita at the time.
Apr 3	1974	United States	Indiana	Depauw, Palmyra, Martinsburg, Daisy Hill	6	SPC-NWS, NCDC, Grazulis, Fujita
1974 Depauw–Daisy Hill tornado – This was one of six tornadoes on April 3 to be rated F5 by Fujita. Homes were swept completely away and entire farms were leveled.
Apr 3	1974	United States	Ohio	Xenia, Wilberforce	32	SPC-NWS, NCDC, Grazulis, Fujita
1974 Xenia tornado – This was the deadliest tornado of the 1974 Super Outbreak. Aerial photography and isoline surveys by Fujita showed that entire rows of brick homes were swept away and sustained F5 damage. Wind-rowing of debris occurred in nearby fields and very intense damage was reported to steel-reinforced schools. This tornado was originally rated F6 by Fujita in a survey of the Super Outbreak.
Apr 3	1974	United States	Kentucky, Indiana	Hardinsburg (KY), Brandenburg (KY), Harrison County (IN)	31	SPC-NWS, NCDC, Grazulis, Fujita
1974 Brandenburg tornado – Multiple well-built, anchor-bolted homes were swept away, including one that sustained total collapse of its poured concrete walk-out basement wall. The grass was scoured from the ground and aerial photography showed extensive wind-rowing in Brandenburg. Trees were completely debarked and low-lying shrubs next to leveled homes were uprooted and stripped. Multiple vehicles were also thrown hundreds of yards and stripped down to their frames.
Apr 3	1974	United States	Indiana, Kentucky, Ohio	Rising Sun (IN), Boone County (KY), Sayler Park (West Cincinnati, OH), Mack (OH), Bridgetown (OH)	3	SPC-NWS, NCDC, Grazulis, Fujita
1974 Cincinnati tornado – Homes were swept away in Sayler Park and a large floating restaurant barge was lifted, ripped from its moorings, and flipped upside-down by the tornado. Boats and vehicles were carried long distances through the air.
Apr 3	1974	United States	Alabama	Mount Hope, Mount Moriah, Tanner, Capshaw, Harvest	28	SPC-NWS, NCDC, Grazulis, Fujita
First Tanner tornado – Numerous homes were swept away and scattered. In Limestone County, where the F5 damage occurred, a large swath of trees was leveled and ground scouring occurred nearby with dirt found to have been dug up and plastered to the bark. A pump was lifted out of a well at one location and shrubbery was debarked as well.
Apr 3	1974	United States	Alabama, Tennessee	Tanner (AL), Capshaw (AL), Harvest (AL), Hazel Green (AL), Vanntown (TN)	22	SPC-NWS, NCDC, NWA
Second Tanner tornado – This tornado is officially listed as an F5, but was rated an F4 by Grazulis and Fujita. It crossed into Tennessee and did F4 damage in both states, though the supposed F5 damage only occurred in Alabama where numerous homes were swept away and extensive wind-rowing of debris occurred. Some of the damage in Tennessee was previously rated F5, but later downgraded to F4.
Apr 3	1974	United States	Alabama	Guin, Twin, Delmar	28	SPC-NWS, NCDC, Grazulis, Fujita
1974 Guin tornado – According to the NWS in Birmingham, Alabama, this is considered one of the strongest tornadoes ever to impact the United States. Sources indicate that F5 damage was reported along much of the path and that many homes in and near Guin sustained F5 damage. Many of these homes were swept away, their debris being scattered across fields, and some reportedly had their "foundations dislodged and in some cases swept away as well". A large industrial plant in Guin was reduced to a pile of mangled beams. Additionally, photographs showed intense wind-rowing from suction vortices. The path of the tornado was visible in satellite imagery, as thousands of trees, including in the William B. Bankhead National Forest, were snapped.
Mar 26	1976	United States	Oklahoma	Spiro	2	SPC-NWS, NCDC, Grazulis
1976 Spiro tornado – Frame homes were swept away and 134,000-pound (61,000 kg) coal cars were tossed. Grazulis originally rated this tornado as an F4, but later upgraded it to F5.
Apr 19	1976	United States	Texas	Brownwood	0	SPC-NWS, NCDC, Grazulis
1976 Brownwood tornado – Homes were swept away, with only a bathtub remaining on one of the foundations. Several teenagers were caught in the open and were picked up and thrown 1,000 yd (910 m; 0.57 mi) but survived. Mesquite trees were shredded. Grazulis originally rated this tornado as an F4, but later upgraded it to F5.
Jun 13	1976	United States	Iowa	Jordan	0	SPC-NWS, NCDC, Grazulis, Fujita
1976 Jordan tornado – Homes were swept away and well-built farms reportedly vanished without a trace. In a conversation with Grazulis concerning the "worst" tornadoes, this tornado was reportedly mentioned by Fujita as having produced some of the most intense instances of damage he surveyed, along with the 1974 Xenia tornado.
Apr 4	1977	United States	Alabama	Birmingham, Tarrant	22	SPC-NWS, NCDC, Grazulis, Fujita
1977 Smithfield tornado – Many homes were swept away, some of which had all of their cinder block walk-out basement walls completely swept away as well. Trees were debarked, and two dump trucks were thrown through the air. Along with an example from the 1970 Lubbock tornado, Fujita used a visual example from this tornado to illustrate F5 damage. Fujita surveyed the damage personally and according to the National Weather Service, he "toyed with the idea of rating the Smithfield tornado an F6".
Apr 2	1982	United States	Oklahoma	Speer, Messer, Golden, Broken Bow	0	SPC-NWS, NCDC, Fujita
1982 Broken Bow tornado – A house was swept away with only carpet tacks left on the empty foundation. The F5 rating is disputed because the home was likely not anchored properly and its destruction "probably" reflected F3-level winds instead. Due to its appearance, Fujita maintained the F5 rating. Other houses suffered F4 damage.
Jun 7–8	1984	United States	Wisconsin	Barneveld, Black Earth	9	SPC-NWS, NCDC, Grazulis, Fujita
1984 Barneveld tornado – A cul-de-sac of newly built homes was swept away and vehicles were thrown hundreds of yards. Small trees were debarked as well. Like the 1966 Topeka tornado, this event also disproved a myth that a nearby ridge or "mound" protected an area from tornadoes.
May 31	1985	United States	Ohio, Pennsylvania	Newton Falls (OH), Lordstown (OH), Niles (OH), Wheatland (PA), Hermitage (PA)	18	SPC-NWS, NCDC, Grazulis, Fujita
1985 Niles–Wheatland tornado – This tornado caused F5 damage along much of its path through Niles and Wheatland. A shopping center in Niles was obliterated, causing several deaths and sustaining F5 damage. Metal girders at the center twisted and buckled. Well-built, anchor-bolted homes were swept away and 75,000-pound (34,000 kg) petroleum storage tanks were ripped from their anchors and thrown hundreds of feet. Pavement was scoured from a parking lot and a steel-frame trucking plant was obliterated and partially swept away with the beams severely mangled. Routing slips from the plant were found wedged into the remaining asphalt of the parking lot. An airplane wing was carried 10 mi (16 km) from where it originated. The tornado remains the only F5 or EF5 in Pennsylvania history. Grazulis called it a "maxi-tornado" to denote its extreme intensity.
Mar 13	1990	United States	Kansas	Castleton, Haven, Burrton, Hesston	1	SPC-NWS, NCDC, Grazulis, Fujita
1990 Hesston tornado – Many homes and businesses were swept away in town with only slabs and empty basements remaining. Industrial buildings were obliterated and vehicles were thrown hundreds of yards and stripped down to their frames.
Mar 13	1990	United States	Kansas	Goessel	1	SPC-NWS, NCDC, Grazulis, Fujita
1990 Goessel tornado – Homes were obliterated and swept away, but the F5 rating was assigned due to very intense cycloidal ground scouring. The tornado is considered by some sources to be one of the strongest tornadoes ever surveyed at the time, though little detailed information about the damage is available.
Aug 28	1990	United States	Illinois	Oswego, Plainfield, Crest Hill, Joliet	29	SPC-NWS, NCDC, Grazulis, Fujita
1990 Plainfield tornado – A mature corn crop was scoured from the ground, leaving nothing but bare soil behind. Several inches of topsoil were blown away as well. A 20 t (44,000 lb) tractor-trailer was tossed from a road and thrown more than 1/2 mi (0.80 km) and vehicles were picked up and carried through the air. The F5 rating is based solely upon the extreme ground scouring; areas in Plainfield sustained high-end F4 structural damage, though the ground scouring nearby was much less intense than where the corn crop was obliterated. Fujita considered the ground scouring to be "comparable to the worst he had seen."
Apr 26	1991	United States	Kansas	McConnell Air Force Base, Andover	17	SPC-NWS, NCDC, Grazulis
1991 Andover tornado – Many large, well-built homes with anchor bolts were swept away, leaving bare foundations behind, and the grass was scoured from the ground. Extensive wind-rowing of debris occurred, leaving streaks of debris extending away from empty foundations. Trees and small twigs were completely stripped of their bark. Vehicles were thrown up to 3/4 mi (1.2 km) from where they originated and were mangled beyond recognition.
Jun 16	1992	United States	Minnesota	Chandler, Lake Wilson	1	SPC-NWS, NCDC, Grazulis, Narramore
1992 Chandler–Lake Wilson tornado – Multiple homes were swept away and vehicles were thrown and stripped down to their frames.
Jul 18	1996	United States	Wisconsin	Oakfield	0	SPC-NWS, NCDC, Grazulis
1996 Oakfield tornado – Well-built homes with anchor bolts were swept away, including one where rebar supports were bent at 60° to 90°. Vehicles were thrown up to 400 yd (370 m) through the air and mangled beyond recognition. Crops were scoured to 1-inch (2.5 cm) stubble. While listing the tornado as an F5, Grazulis considered its rating to be "somewhat questionable".
May 27	1997	United States	Texas	Jarrell	27	SPC-NWS, NCDC, Grazulis
Jarrell tornado – This tornado produced some of the most extreme damage ever documented. The entire subdivision of Double Creek Estates was swept completely away with very little debris remaining. Some of the obliterated homes were well-built and properly anchor-bolted to their foundations. Long expanses of pavement, cumulatively 525 ft (160 m) in length, were torn from roads and a large swath of ground was scoured out to a depth of 18 in (46 cm). Vehicles were torn apart and scattered across fields, "several dozen" of which were reportedly never found, and a recycling plant was obliterated. Trees were completely debarked and mutilated cattle were carried more than 1/4 mi (0.40 km). The tornado was very slow-moving, which may have exacerbated the destruction to some extent.
Apr 8	1998	United States	Alabama	Oak Grove, Sylvan Springs, Pleasant Grove, Edgewater, Birmingham	32	SPC-NWS, NCDC, Grazulis
1998 Oak Grove–Birmingham tornado – Many homes were swept away along the path.
Apr 16	1998	United States	Tennessee	Wayne County, Lawrence County	0	SPC-NWS, NCDC, NWA, Grazulis
1998 Lawrence County tornado – Many large and well-built homes with anchor bolts were swept away and vehicles were thrown hundreds of yards. A swath of grass 200 ft (61 m) wide was scoured from the ground, with nothing but bare soil and clumps of dirt remaining; according to Grazulis, this phenomenon indicated "extreme" winds at ground level. This tornado is the only documented F5 in the history of Tennessee.
May 3	1999	United States	Oklahoma	Amber, Bridge Creek, Newcastle, Moore, Oklahoma City, Del City, Midwest City	36	SPC-NWS, NCDC, Grazulis, DOW, Wurman
1999 Bridge Creek–Moore tornado – Mobile radar recorded winds up to 321 mph (517 km/h), which is the highest wind speed ever measured on Earth. Many homes were swept completely away, some of which were well-bolted to their foundations, and debris from some homes was finely granulated. Severe ground and pavement scouring occurred including removing pavement. Trees and shrubs were completely debarked and vehicles were thrown up to 440 yd (400 m) from where they originated. An airplane wing was carried for several miles and a 36,000-pound (16,000 kg) freight car was bounced 3/4 mi (1.2 km). This was the 50th and last tornado to be officially rated F5 on the Fujita scale in the United States before the introduction of the Enhanced Fujita Scale in 2007.
Jun 22	2007	Canada	Manitoba	Elie	0	ECCC
2007 Elie tornado – Two homes were swept away, including one that was well-bolted to its foundation. A few of the bolts themselves were snapped off. A van was thrown 150 m (490 ft) through the air and nearby trees were completely debarked as well. Only officially rated F5 tornado in Canada. This was the last official tornado to be rated F5 due to Environment Canada utilizing the Enhanced Fujita Scale beginning April 1, 2013.

==== EF5 tornadoes ====
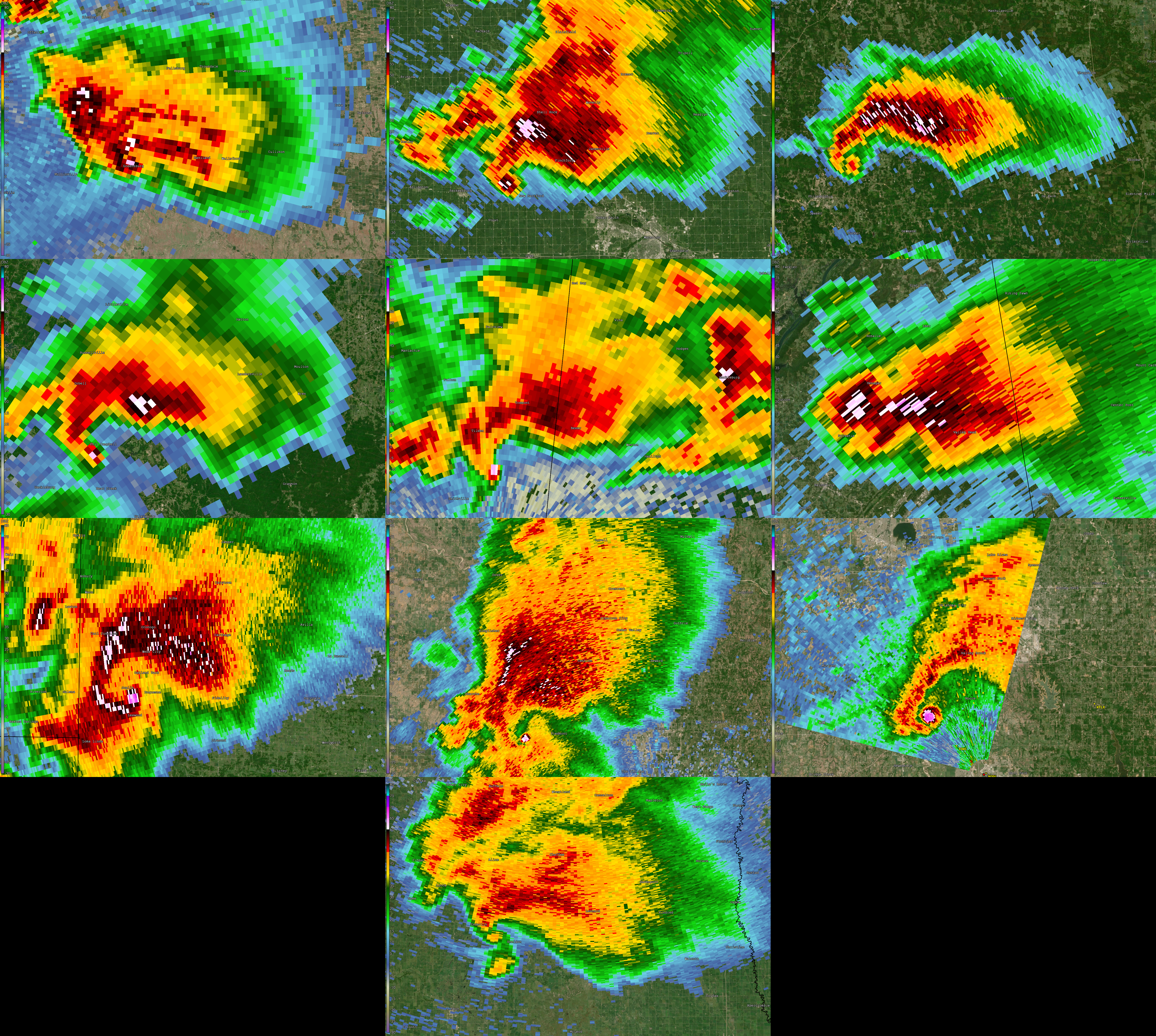
Collage of all U.S. tornadoes given a rating of EF5 on the Enhanced Fujita scale, in order of occurrence.

Worldwide, 10 tornadoes have the rating of EF5 on the Enhanced Fujita scale. (Note: Two tornadoes in France have been simultaneously rated EF5 and IF5. For simplicity, they are listed under IF5.)

Tornadoes officially rated EF5
Day	Year	Country	Subdivision	Location	Fatalities	Rated by
May 4	2007	United States	Kansas	Greensburg	12	SPC-NWS, Marshall
Greensburg tornado – This tornado damaged or destroyed 95% of the town, including seven well-built homes with anchor bolts that were swept away. Vehicles were thrown hundreds of yards and mangled, including a pickup truck that was split in two and found a 1 mi (1.6 km) away. Furthermore, freight train cars were overturned, and multi-ton oil tanks were destroyed. Fire hydrants were ripped from the ground in town and large trees were completely denuded and debarked as well. Aerial views of the tornado's path showed spiral and erratic paths from suction vortices in fields before it hit Greensburg; the area was severely scoured with some vegetation removed. Just northwest of the town, violent damage to evergreen trees occurred. This was the first tornado to have been rated EF5 after the retirement of the original Fujita Scale in the United States in February 2007.
May 25	2008	United States	Iowa	Parkersburg, New Hartford	9	SPC-NWS
2008 Parkersburg–New Hartford tornado – Well-built homes with anchor bolts were swept away, 17 of which were assessed to have sustained EF5 damage. Two of them had no visible debris left anywhere near the foundations. A concrete walk-out basement wall was pushed over at one home and the concrete floor was cracked. A rebar support set into the foundation of another home was found snapped in half and reinforced concrete light poles were snapped and dragged along the ground. A large industrial building was completely destroyed with metal beams twisted and sheared off at their bases and the foundation pushed clean of the metal framing and debris. Vehicles were thrown long distances and stripped down to their frames as well. Additionally, a large field east of Parkersburg was filled with finely granulated debris that was wind-rowed in long streaks. Trees were completely debarked and shrubs were uprooted and stripped in some areas. Numerous vehicles were mangled beyond recognition, including a ford minivan that was left torn apart by the winds.
Apr 27	2011	United States	Mississippi	Northern Philadelphia, Coy, Winston County, Noxubee County	3	SPC-NWS
2011 Philadelphia, Mississippi tornado – Rated EF5 based upon extreme ground scouring. The tornado dug a trench 2 ft (0.61 m) deep into a pasture, leaving nothing but large clumps of dirt and bare topsoil behind. A tied-down mobile home was lofted through the air and carried 300 yd (270 m) with no indication of contact with the ground. Several vehicles were tossed hundreds of yards and wrapped around trees.
Apr 27	2011	United States	Alabama	Hamilton, Hackleburg, Phil Campbell, Mount Hope, Tanner, Athens, Harvest	71	SPC-NWS
2011 Hackleburg–Phil Campbell tornado – This was the deadliest tornado in Alabama history and the deadliest tornado of the 2011 Super Outbreak. Numerous homes, some of which were large, well-built, and anchor-bolted were swept away. Debris from some obliterated homes was scattered and wind-rowed well away from the foundations. One home that was swept away had its concrete stem-walls sheared off at ground level. Vehicles were thrown at least 200 yd (180 m), and at least one large vehicle that was missing after the tornado was never located, another was wrapped around a debarked tree. Hundreds of trees were completely debarked and twisted and in some cases were reduced only to stubs. Pavement was scoured from roads, a large industrial plant was leveled to the ground, and a restaurant that was swept away had a small portion of its foundation slab torn apart as well. This tornado was initially rated an EF3, but it was upgraded to an EF5 on April 30, 2011.
Apr 27	2011	United States	Mississippi, Alabama	Smithville, Shottsville	23	SPC-NWS
2011 Smithville tornado – Numerous well-built, anchor-bolted brick homes were swept away. Floor tiles were ripped from the foundations of several homes. An SUV was thrown half a mile into the top of the town's water tower and was recovered on the opposite side of town. Other vehicles were torn into multiple pieces, stripped down to their frames, wrapped around trees, or simply never recovered. Chip and tar pavement was torn from road and large trees were completely debarked. A large brick funeral home was reduced to a bare slab and extensive wind-rowing of debris occurred next to the foundation. Outside of town, the ground was deeply scoured in an open field. Additionally, low-lying vegetation and shrubbery were completely debarked and shredded.
Apr 27	2011	United States	Alabama, Georgia	Fyffe, Shiloh, Rainsville, Sylvania, Henagar, Ider, Rising Fawn	25	SPC-NWS
2011 Rainsville tornado – Many homes were swept away, some of which had their concrete porches torn away and shattered with debris strewn up to a mile away from the foundations in some cases. A few of the homes were bolted to their foundations. An 800-pound (360 kg) safe was ripped from its anchors and thrown 600 ft (180 m) and its door was ripped from its frame. Ground scouring occurred and sidewalk pavement was pulled up. Many vehicles were mangled beyond recognition, including a pickup truck which was tossed 250 yd (230 m) and torn apart. A school bus was hurled across a highway and shredded down to its bare chassis. An underground storm shelter had much of its dirt covering scoured away and was heaved slightly out of the ground and pavement was scoured from roads. One well-built stone house was obliterated and a stone pillar was ripped completely out of the ground at that residence, pulling up a section of house foundation in the process.
May 22	2011	United States	Missouri	Joplin, Duquesne	158	SPC-NWS, Marshall
Joplin tornado – This was the deadliest tornado in the United States since 1947. Many homes, business, and steel-frame industrial buildings were swept away and large vehicles including semi-trucks and buses were thrown hundreds of yards. Reinforced concrete porches were deformed, lifted, and tossed, and 300-pound (140 kg) concrete parking stops anchored with rebar were ripped from parking lots and tossed well over 100 ft (30 m). Vehicles were thrown several blocks away from the residences where they originated and a few were never recovered. Damage to driveways was noted at some residences as well. A large steel-reinforced concrete "step and floor structure" leading to one building was warped slightly and cracked. Ground and pavement scouring occurred and heavy manhole covers were removed from roads as well. On June 10, 2013, an engineering study found no evidence of EF5 structural damage in Joplin due to the poor quality of construction of many buildings. However, the EF5 rating stood as the National Weather Service in Springfield, Missouri, stated that survey team found an area of EF5 structural damage (at and around the hospital) and that it could have easily been missed in the survey. The EF5 rating was mainly based on large vehicles being thrown long distances, along with non-conventional, non-structural instances of damage, such as removal of manhole covers, pavement, concrete porches, driveways, parking stops, and the presence of wind-rowed debris. Furthermore, the engineering survey only examined a small portion of the damage swath. Timothy Marshall identified 22 homes which sustained EF5 damage, some of the most EF5 damage rated by a single tornado. This was also the deadliest single tornado in over 50 years and the deadliest SPC "Moderate Risk" (i.e. no "High Risk" area) convective outlook day on record. Some unofficial estimates have put the peak winds as high as 225–250 mph (362–402 km/h), but this has not been confirmed.
May 24	2011	United States	Oklahoma	Hinton, Calumet, El Reno, Piedmont, Guthrie	9	SPC-NWS, Wurman, DOW
2011 El Reno–Piedmont tornado – Many homes were swept away, trees and shrubs were completely debarked, and extensive ground scouring occurred. At the Cactus 117 oil rig, a 1,900,000-pound (860,000 kg) oil derrick was blown over and rolled several times. Cars were thrown long distances and wrapped around trees, including an SUV that was thrown 780 yd (710 m) and had its body ripped from the frame. Several cars near the beginning of the path were thrown more than 1,093 yd (999 m). Additionally, a 20,000-pound (9,100 kg) oil tanker truck was thrown approximately 1 mi (1.6 km). Mobile Doppler weather radar indicated wind speeds as high as 295 mph (475 km/h), which are some of the highest wind speeds ever recorded in a tornado.
May 20	2013	United States	Oklahoma	Newcastle, Moore	24	SPC-NWS, Marshall
2013 Moore tornado – Many homes were swept away, including nine that were well-built and bolted to their foundations. Two elementary schools were completely destroyed. Extensive ground scouring occurred with only bare soil left in some areas and a 10 t (22,000 lb) propane tank was thrown more than 1/2 mi (0.80 km) through the air. Trees and shrubs were completely debarked, wind-rowing of debris was noted, and an oil tank was thrown a full 1 mi (1.6 km) from a production site, while another was never found. A manhole cover was removed near Moore Medical Center and vehicles were thrown hundreds of yards and torn into multiple pieces. The tornado was originally assigned a rating of a high-end EF4, but it was upgraded to EF5 on May 21, less than 24 hours after touchdown.
Jun 20	2025	United States	North Dakota	Enderlin	3	NWS, Marshall, NTP, LaDue, Miller, Kopp, Sills
2025 Enderlin tornado – A train was derailed, with 33 fully-loaded grain hopper cars and empty tank cars being tipped over or lofted, including one empty tanker car that was tossed about 600–1,000 ft (180–300 m). The tornado also swept away several homes, and caused extreme tree damage, with only stubs of large branches or trunks remaining, and debarking with a "sandpapering" effect was prevalent. The tornado was preliminarily assigned a rating of high-end EF3, but was upgraded to EF5 on October 6, with winds "greater than 210 miles per hour (340 km/h)" based on the train derailment, ending a 12-year EF5 drought.

==== IF5 tornadoes ====
Worldwide, eight tornadoes have the rating of IF5 on the International Fujita scale.

Tornadoes officially rated IF5
Day	Year	Country	Subdivision	Location	Fatalities	Rated by
Jun 29	1764	Germany	Mecklenburg-Vorpommern	Woldegk	1	ESSL, Sävert
1764 Woldegk tornado – A spacious, two-story mansion was completely leveled and oak tree stumps were torn from the ground. Trees were debarked, crops and grass scoured from the ground. Only tornado to be rated as T11. The rating was assigned based on several surveys by German scientist Gottlob Burchard Genzmer. 5-to-10-centimetre-diameter (2.0 to 3.9 in) hail occurred during this tornado as well. The ESSL later updated the official rating to IF5.
Apr 23	1800	Germany	Saxony	Hainichen	0	ESSL, Sävert
Homes were completely destroyed, trees and shrubbery debarked, and several heads of livestock fatally mutilated. The ESSL later updated the official F5/T10 rating to IF5.
Aug 19	1845	France	Normandy	Montville	75	Keraunos, ESSL, TORRO
1845 Montville tornado – Three large mills, at least one of which was newly built, were leveled and partly swept clean. One of the mills was a four-story structure that likely collapsed. Large debris was carried 30 km (19 mi) and mature trees were thrown "very far." This tornado was rated EF5 by the French Observatory of Tornadoes and Violent Thunderstorms (Keraunos), with the European Severe Storms Laboratory acknowledging the EF5 rating as its "maximum intensity", though ESSL also rated the tornado F5, later changed to IF5. TORRO rated the tornado T10.
Oct 7	1884	Italy	Sicily	Catania	28	ESSL
Masonry houses with meter-thick walls were completely destroyed and other homes were nearly fully leveled. On 13 December 2025, the tornado was officially upgraded from high-end IF4 to IF5.
Jun 1	1927	Netherlands	Gelderland, Overijssel	Neede	7	ESSL, KNMI
Very well-built masonry houses in Neede were completely destroyed, a threshing machine from a farm was thrown hundreds of meters away, and a several-ton train car was flipped. This tornado was originally rated (I)F4 before being upgraded to IF5 in November of 2025.
Jul 24	1930	Italy	Treviso, Udine	Volpago del Montello, Selva del Montello, Giavera del Montello, Nervesa della Battaglia	23	ESSL, TORRO
1930 Montello tornado – An extremely powerful tornado which destroyed many villages and 200 homes. A large stone monastery was partially leveled to the ground. TORRO rated the tornado T10 on the TORRO scale, while the European Severe Storms Laboratory rated the tornado F5 on the Fujita scale. In May 2024, the F5 rating was changed to IF5, marking the first tornado to receive an IF5 rating on the International Fujita scale.
Jun 16	1957	Italy	Lombardy	Valle Scuropasso	6	ESSL
Many large stone buildings were flattened. Initially rated as a high-end F4, but in March 2026 was re-rated as an IF5.
Jun 24	1967	France	Hauts-de-France	Palluel	6	ESSL, Keraunos
Homes were leveled or swept away in and near Palluel, cars were thrown over 200 m (220 yd) and a strong-framed building with thick walls was almost completely leveled to the ground. This tornado was rated EF5 by the French Observatory of Tornadoes and Violent Thunderstorms (Keraunos). Grazulis rated this tornado as an F3. In 2024, the initial F5 rating from the European Severe Storms Laboratory was changed to IF5.

=== Possible F5/EF5/IF5 tornadoes ===
Because the distinctions between F4/EF4/T9 and F5/EF5/T10 tornadoes are often ambiguous, the official ratings of numerous other tornadoes formally rated below F5/EF5/T10 or equivalent have been disputed, with certain government sources or independent studies contradicting the official record.

==== Previously rated F5/EF5/IF5 or rated F5/EF5/IF5 by others ====
This list includes tornadoes previously rated F5 or EF5 by the National Weather Service as well as tornadoes rated F5/EF5 by other branches of the United States government, tornado experts (i.e. Thomas P. Grazulis, Ted Fujita), or meteorological research institutions (i.e. European Severe Storms Laboratory).

Tornadoes rated F5/EF5/T10 by other experts or groups besides the National Weather Service
Day	Year	Country	Subdivision	Location	Fatalities	Rated by
Mar 21	1952	United States	Mississippi, Tennessee	Byhalia (MS), Moscow (TN)	17	NCDC
Tornado outbreak of March 21–22, 1952 – This tornado is officially rated F4 in tornado databases; however, the National Climatic Data Center lists this as an F5 event in a technical report listing all known F5 tornadoes. The only possible F5 damage was to a concrete block structure that may or may not have been steel-reinforced. It originally was the first officially ranked F5 tornado in the United States, but was later downgraded to F4.
Jun 9	1953	United States	Massachusetts	Petersham, Barre, Rutland, Holden, Worcester, Shrewsbury, Westborough, Southborough	94	Grazulis
1953 Worcester tornado – Many strong structures with numerous interior walls were leveled, and entire blocks of homes were swept cleanly away. The large, brick Assumption College sustained severe damage, and its upper stories were completely destroyed. A large, multi-ton storage tank was carried over a road, and trees along the path were debarked as well. Debris from this tornado was found in the Atlantic Ocean. In 1993 Grazulis noted that an F5 rating was "probably appropriate," and in a later publication of his, in 2001, the tornado was directly rated F5, based on newly available photographs of the "immense" destruction, which indicated that the tornado merited an F5 rating and "should" have been rated as such in 1975, but was instead rated F4 at that time. Even after an unprecedented reassessment of damages in 2005, a panel of experts assembled by the National Weather Service determined that anchoring techniques for the homes that were swept away or had completely vanished could not be determined. Without a proper engineering qualification, it would be nearly impossible to determine with 100% accuracy which damage was F5 and which was F4, as appearances would be similar. As a result, the panel decided that the rating would remain a high-end F4.
May 19	1960	United States	Kansas	Wamego, St. Marys	0	Grazulis
Two farms were swept away. This tornado was rated F5 by Grazulis.
May 30	1961	United States	Nebraska	Gates, Ord	0	NCDC, Grazulis
All buildings and machinery were swept away from a farm. Widely accepted as an F5 tornado, including within a NCDC technical report; however, it is listed as an F4 in the official databases.
Apr 11	1965	United States	Indiana	Dunlap	36	NCDC, Grazulis
1965 Palm Sunday tornado outbreak – This was the second violent tornado to strike Dunlap within 90 minutes. A well-built truck stop was leveled and many permanent homes were swept away in two subdivisions.
Apr 11	1965	United States	Indiana	Lebanon, Sheridan	28	NCDC
1965 Palm Sunday tornado outbreak – Farms were obliterated and vehicles were thrown up 100 yd (91 m).
Apr 11	1965	United States	Ohio	Pittsfield Township, Strongsville	18	NCDC, Grazulis
1965 Palm Sunday tornado outbreak – Homes were cleanly swept away in Strongsville and Pittsfield, and Pittsfield was completely destroyed. Only a concrete war monument remained standing in Pittsfield, where homes "vanished".
May 8	1965	United States	Nebraska	Wolbach, Primrose	4	NCDC, Grazulis
Early May 1965 tornado outbreak – Homes and businesses were leveled and swept away, along with mature trees that were reduced to pulpy "matchsticks". Cars were moved 400–440 yd (0.23–0.25 mi), and the body of a truck was tossed and rolled 2 mi (3.2 km). Grazulis listed this tornado as an F5.
Apr 27	1971	United States	Kentucky	Gosser Ridge	2	NCDC
1971 Gosser Ridge tornado – Most buildings on a farm were swept away. The tornado is listed as a "questionable" F5 in the NCDC Tech Report, and is rated an F4 according to Grazulis and official records.
Mar 31	1973	United States	South Carolina	Calhoun Falls, Abbeville	7	NCDC, Fujita
Over 100 homes were affected. 30 people were injured. This tornado was initially rated F5 by Ted Fujita, though it was later downgraded to F4.
May 24	1973	United States	Oklahoma	Union City	2	Lemon, Davies-Jones, Moller, Doswell III
1973 Union City tornado – Rated F5 by multiple non-NWS publications due to damage at two farmsteads.
Apr 3	1974	United States	Tennessee	Lincoln County, Franklin County, Coffee County	11	NWS, NWA
1974 Super Outbreak – This intense tornado caused unverifiable F5 damage when it leveled and swept away several "well-constructed homes" in Franklin County. Destroyed roughly 46 homes and 90 barns in just that county alone. Developed from the same thunderstorm that produced the first F5 Tanner tornado. Previously rated F5 by NWS, but later downgraded to F4.
Jun 9	1984	Soviet Union (Russia)	Ivanovo Oblast	Ivanovo, Lunevo	69	TORRO, ESSL
1984 Soviet Union tornado outbreak – An extremely intense multiple-vortex tornado swept wooden homes away, overturned a 320 t (710,000 lb) crane and mangled vehicles. Pavement was stripped from highway near Ivanovo and numerous trees were snapped or debarked. The tornado was exceptionally long-lived, remaining on the ground for roughly 100 mi (160 km) over the course of two hours. At least 69 fatalities were confirmed, though the actual toll was likely higher. This tornado was originally rated as an F5 by European Severe Weather Database on the basis of 50 t (110,000 lb) water tank being thrown 200 m (660 ft), however, the water tank was revealed to be elevated, which helps it to fly this distance. In 2018, the rating was downgraded from F5 to an F4. TORRO rated this tornado as an T10 and still keeps this rating.
Jun 8	1995	United States	Texas	McLean, Kellerville	0	VORTEX
Tornado outbreak of June 8, 1995 – Project VORTEX assessed this tornado to be an F5. Intense pavement and ground scouring occurred, with only bare soil left in some areas.
Jun 8	1995	United States	Texas	Allison	0	NWS, VORTEX
Tornado outbreak of June 8, 1995 – A National Weather Service damage survey was not conducted due in part to the extensive damage and injuries from another tornado in Pampa, Texas. Four homes were destroyed and more than 800 head of livestock were killed. An NCDC report states that "all sighting reports would place this as an F5 tornado" with storm spotters calling it "one of the biggest and meanest appearing tornadoes they had ever seen". However, this tornado hit few man-made structures and a significant amount of time elapsed before damage could be examined, so it could not be rated higher than F4.
Apr 16	1998	United States	Tennessee	Hardin County, Wayne County	3	NWS
Tornado outbreak of April 15–16, 1998 – Originally considered part of a very long-tracked F5 tornado but was later determined to have been the first in a series of three separate, violent tornadoes. Multiple homes were reduced to their foundations. Although officially rated an F4, a re-analysis conducted in 2013 by the NWS Office in Nashville noted that the damage in Wayne County may warrant EF5; however, no tornadoes are rated using the enhanced scale that occurred prior to February 2007.
Apr 28	2002	United States	Maryland	La Plata	3	NWS
2002 La Plata tornado – Initially rated F5 by the National Weather Service, but was downgraded in a secondary damage survey conducted by Timothy Marshall. This preliminary F5 rating, partly due to damage to a brick building in downtown La Plata, was lowered to F4, after the damage assessment team determined some of the damage was likely due to flying debris from a lumber company nearby. Damage to houses, initially rated F5, were lowered when an engineering survey determined these homes were not properly anchored, causing them to be swept off their foundations by lesser winds.
Apr 27	2011	United States	Alabama	Tuscaloosa, Holt, Hueytown, Concord, Pleasant Grove, McDonald Chapel, Birmingham, Fultondale	64	NWS, Murayama, Velev, Zlateva
2011 Tuscaloosa–Birmingham tornado – Officially rated high-end EF4, though the final rating was a source of controversy, and one survey team rated some of the damage as EF5. Many homes, a large section of an apartment building, and a clubhouse were swept away, though these structures were either poorly anchored, lacked interior walls, or surrounded by contextual damage not consistent with an EF5 tornado. A manhole cover was removed from a drain and thrown into a ravine near the clubhouse. A 34 t (75,000 lb) railroad trestle support structure was thrown 100 ft (30 m) up a hill, and a 35.8 t (79,000 lb) coal car was thrown 391 ft (119 m) through the air. In 2019, Yuko Murayama, Dimiter Velev & Plamena Zlateva edited a book of revised academically peer-reviewed papers, in which they directly rated the Tuscaloosa tornado an EF5.
May 24	2011	United States	Oklahoma	Bradley, Washington, Goldsby	0	Ortega, Murayama, Velev, Zlateva
2011 Washington-Goldsby tornado – Officially rated high-end EF4 with winds up to 200 mph (320 km/h), this tornado swept away multiple well-built, anchor-bolted homes. Vehicles were thrown long distances and mangled beyond recognition. The National Weather Service noted the structures destroyed were "falling just short of the damage indicator for an EF5". Kiel Ortega, a National Weather Service damage surveyor discussed with another surveyor saying, "some people believe it should have been rated EF5". In 2019, Yuko Murayama, Dimiter Velev & Plamena Zlateva edited a book of revised academically peer-reviewed papers, in which they directly rated the Washington—Goldsby tornado an EF5.
May 31	2013	United States	Oklahoma	El Reno	8	NWS, Murayama, Velev, Zlateva
2013 El Reno tornado – Originally rated as an EF5, which is based on mobile Doppler Weather Radar data of picking up winds of 302 mph (486 km/h). However, the lack of available damage resulted into rating downgrading from EF5 to an EF3. This tornado holds the record for the widest tornado ever recorded at 2.6 miles (4.2 km) wide. In 2019, Yuko Murayama, Dimiter Velev & Plamena Zlateva edited a book of revised academically peer-reviewed papers, in which they directly rated the El Reno tornado an EF5. This was reaffirmed in March 2024 by scientists with the National Oceanic and Atmospheric Administration and University of Oklahoma which stated winds between 115–150 m/s (260–340 mph; 410–540 km/h) was measured less than 100 metres (110 yd) off the ground.

==== Possible F5/EF5/IF5 damage ====
This list includes tornadoes with possible F5 or EF5 damage indicated by the National Weather Service as well as tornadoes with possible F5/EF5 damage by other branches of the United States government, tornado experts (i.e. Thomas P. Grazulis, Ted Fujita), or meteorological research institutions (i.e. European Severe Storms Laboratory).

Tornadoes officially rated below F5/EF5/T10 or equivalent but which may have caused F5/EF5/T10+ damage
Day	Year	Country	Subdivision	Location	Fatalities	Rated by
Jun 17	1946	United States, Canada	Michigan, Ontario	River Rouge (MI), Windsor (ON), LaSalle (ON), Tecumseh (ON)	17	ECCC
1946 Windsor–Tecumseh tornado – This tornado was officially rated F4; however, one home had a portion of its concrete block foundation pulled out of the ground and carried away, indicating borderline F5 damage. Some victims were mutilated, dismembered or stripped of their clothes.
May 18	1951	United States	Texas	Olney	2	Grazulis
Many homes in town were destroyed, some of which were swept away with very little debris left. Grazulis called this tornado a "possible" F5.
Sep 26	1951	United States	Wisconsin	Waupaca	6	Grazulis
This tornado obliterated a trio of farmsteads. It was mentioned as a probable F5 by Grazulis.
May 22	1952	United States	Kansas	Linwood, Edwardsville	0	Grazulis
Tornado outbreak of May 21–24, 1952 – The home of a bank president was leveled. Grazulis considered the tornado to be "possibly F5".
Jun 8	1953	United States	Ohio	Cygnet	18	Grazulis
Flint–Worcester tornado outbreak sequence – Possible but unverifiable F5 damage occurred near Cygnet where homes were swept completely away. A steel-and-concrete bridge was destroyed as the tornado passed near Jerry City.
May 1	1954	United States	Texas, Oklahoma	Crowell (TX), Vernon (TX), Snyder (OK)	0	Grazulis
Vehicle was thrown and rolled 0.5 mi (800 m), and four farms were entirely swept away. Grazulis considered the tornado to be a probable F5.
Jul 2	1955	United States	North Dakota	Walcott	2	Grazulis
A photograph of a farmhouse showed possible F5 damage.
May 21	1957	United States	Missouri	Fremont, Van Buren	7	Grazulis
May 1957 Central Plains tornado outbreak sequence – Most of Fremont was destroyed, with many structures swept away. Possible F5 damage occurred to schools, homes, and businesses near the railroad tracks, but houses in the area were poorly constructed.
Jun 10	1958	United States	Kansas	El Dorado	15	Grazulis
Reports indicated possible F5-level damage to homes. A car was thrown 100 yd (91 m), but damage photographs were inconclusive as to whether F5 structural damage occurred. Nevertheless, the tornado was considered to be a probable F5 by Grazulis.
Aug 14	1959	Brazil	Paraná	Palmas, Fazenda Fortaleza	35	Independent studies
Homes were swept away, including a newly-built two-story farmhouse that was completely destroyed, leaving only the floor. People were thrown more than 50 m (55 yd), resulting in instant death. A steam locomotive was thrown 40 metres (44 yd) to 50 metres (55 yd) away and impacted a large tree. Entire trees were uprooted and destroyed, and herds of cattle were decimated. A farmer's jacket, with his wallet and documents in the pocket, was found about 70 km (43 mi) away. Multiple independent studies consider this tornado as an F5.
Jun 6	1963	United States	South Dakota	Swett, Patricia	0	Grazulis
A church and a home literally vanished. Grazulis considered the tornado to be possibly F5, but it listed as only F3 in the official database.
Apr 12	1964	United States	Kansas	Lawrence	0	Grazulis
Farms were leveled and a truck was thrown 300 yd (270 m). Grazulis noted possible F5 damage.
Apr 23	1968	United States	Kentucky, Ohio	Falmouth (KY), Ripley (OH)	6	Grazulis
Tornado outbreak of April 21–24, 1968 – This tornado was mentioned as a possible F5 by Grazulis.
Jun 9	1984	Soviet Union (Russia)	Kostroma Oblast	Kostroma, Lyubim	0	Pending
1984 Soviet Union tornado outbreak – Officially rated F4, but survey mentions possible F5 damage. Trees were ripped from the ground and thrown long distances. A 350,000 kg (770,000 lb) industrial crane was blown over.
May 31	1985	United States	Pennsylvania	Parker Dam State Park, Moshannon State Forest	0	NWS
1985 United States–Canada tornado outbreak – This tornado may have been capable of producing F5 damage over rural areas.
Jul 31	1987	Canada	Alberta	Edmonton	27	ECCC
Edmonton tornado – Heavy trailers and oil tanks were tossed, large factories were leveled, grass was scoured from the ground and wind-rowing of debris occurred. If confirmed by Environment Canada, this would make it the earliest such tornado since records have been kept, next to the 2007 Elie tornado.
Jan 7	1989	United States	Illinois	Allendale	0	Grazulis
This tornado was considered by Grazulis to be a more plausible candidate for an F5 rating than the "questionable" Oakfield tornado in 1996.
Apr 26	1991	United States	Kansas	Arkansas City, Hackney, Winfield, Tisdale	1	Grazulis
1991 Andover tornado outbreak – According to an informal survey conducted by a group of storm chasers, one home was so obliterated that the National Weather Service survey likely missed it.
Nov 29	1992	Australia	Queensland	Bucca	0	Callaghan
Bucca tornado – One of the most violent tornadoes ever to have occurred in Australia and was the first Australian tornado to be officially rated F4. The tornado flattened some houses to the ground, trees were snapped and stones were embedded into the trunks. A refrigerator was blown away and never found and a 3 t (6,600 lb) truck was thrown 300 m (330 yd). Jeff Callaghan, a retired senior severe weather forecaster for the Bureau of Meteorology conducted a case study on this tornado and said it "was rated a F4 or possibly an F5".
Jun 8	1995	United States	Texas	Pampa	0	Grazulis
1995 Pampa tornado – This tornado would have likely produced F5 damage had it struck residential areas. Grazulis considered the tornado a candidate for an F6 rating based on photogrammetric video analysis.
May 11	1999	United States	Texas	Loyal Valley	1	Flores, Hecke
1999 Loyal Valley tornado – Officially rated high-end F4, though one survey revealed potential F5 damage. Two homes were completely swept away, with debris scattered over great distances. Large pieces of a pickup truck were found 3/4 mi (1.2 km) from the residence where it originated, and a 720-foot (220 m) stretch of pavement was scoured from a road. Ground scouring occurred, and numerous mesquite trees were completely debarked. A reporter who also witnessed the destruction at Jarrell, Eddie Flores, said: "I hadn't seen anything like that. I couldn't believe what it did to animals. This was wiped clean, too, but the cattle - their hides had been ripped right off of them. Some of them were missing heads, and some were caught up and entwined in barbed wire". Had this tornado touched down in an urban area, the devastation likely would have rivaled that from Oklahoma City or the storm that leveled a subdivision in Jarrell in 1997, - stated meteorologist Bill Hecke.
May 12	2004	United States	Kansas	Harper	0	Hayes
An anchor-bolted, two-story farmhouse was completely swept away with debris being absent. Trees and shrubs were completely debarked, and cars were torn apart. Surveyor Chance Hayes from the NWS in Wichita, Kansas rated this tornado as F4 for its very slow movement, but later express regret over the conservative rating.
May 24	2011	United States	Oklahoma	Chickasha, Blanchard, Newcastle	1	NWS, Murayama, Velev, Zlateva
2011 Chickasha–Blanchard tornado – Officially rated a high-end EF4; however, the survey conducted by NWS Norman mentions this tornado as being a "plausible EF5". Well-built homes with anchor bolts were swept away, pavement was scoured from roads and driveways, and vehicles were thrown up to 600 yd (550 m) away, some of which were torn into multiple pieces or stripped down to their frames. Trees were reduced to completely debarked stumps, and severe ground scouring occurred, with all grass and several inches of topsoil removed in some areas. A reinforced concrete dome home was severely damaged and cracked. In 2019, Yuko Murayama, Dimiter Velev & Plamena Zlateva edited a book of revised academically peer-reviewed papers, in which they directly rated the Chickasha tornado an EF5.
Mar 2	2012	United States	Indiana, Kentucky	Fredericksburg, Henryville, Bedford	11	NWS
2012 Southern Indiana tornado – A violent stovepipe tornado (often referred to as the "Henryville Tornado") that carved a 49 mi (79 km) path of damage from Fredericksburg, Indiana to the Bedford, Kentucky area. This tornado was officially rated a low-end EF4. In 2022, the National Weather Service of Louisville referred to a possible EF5 damage location at a demolished house, where a pickup truck was blown away and never found and a backhoe was deposited into the basement of the house.
Apr 27	2014	United States	Arkansas	Mayflower, Vilonia	16	NWS, Marshall, Grazulis, Murayama, Velev, Zlateva
2014 Mayflower–Vilonia tornado – Officially rated high-end EF4, though the rating was a major source of controversy, and meteorologist/civil engineer Timothy P. Marshall noted that the rating assigned was "lower-bound" and "the possibility that EF5 winds could have occurred" despite the structural flaws responsible for the EF4 rating. Numerous homes were swept completely away with only bare slabs left, including one that was well-bolted to its foundation, and extensive wind-rowing of debris occurred. Trees were completely debarked and denuded, shrubs were shredded and debarked, and vehicles were thrown hundreds of yards and stripped down to their frames. In one instance, a well-built house was swept away, but an EF5 rating was not assigned as it was just one house and it had been struck by debris from other buildings. A large 30,000-pound (14,000 kg) metal fertilizer tank was found approximately 3/4 mi (1.2 km) away from where it originated. Extensive ground scouring occurred as well. In 2019, Yuko Murayama, Dimiter Velev & Plamena Zlateva edited a book of revised academically peer-reviewed papers, in which they directly rated the Mayflower—Vilonia tornado an EF5.
Apr 9	2015	United States	Illinois	Rochelle, Fairdale	2	NWS, Prevatt
2015 Rochelle-Fairdale tornado – Well-built, anchor-bolted homes were swept away with debris being wind-rowed long distances. One house had its concrete walkway shifted a few inches. A concrete silo was blown off its foundation and a car was thrown 1 mi (1.6 km). The University of Florida’s Wind Hazard Damage Assessment Team noted "complete destruction of numerous homes in the tornadoes path". The tornado was ultimately given an EF4 rating, with estimated maximum winds of 200 mph (320 km/h); 1 mph shy of being rated as an EF5, which starts at 201 mph (323 km/h). On 1 August 2025, Anthony W. Lyza has listed the tornado as a candidate for an EF5 rating. He further argues that the EF5 rating starting at 201 mph is inconsistent with the historical F5 ratings.
Mar 24	2023	United States	Mississippi	Rolling Fork, Silver City	17	NWS, NSSL, OU
2023 Rolling Fork–Silver City tornado – A violent tornado that damaged or destroyed over 78% of Rolling Fork and over 96% of Silver City, with at least 300 homes sustaining damage in Rolling Fork. Following the tornado, Logan Poole, a meteorologist and damage surveyor with the National Weather Service in Jackson, Mississippi, gave an interview regarding the tornado and why it was rated EF4 rather than EF5. In the interview, Poole stated, "The Green Apple Florist, essentially a single family home that was modified to built to be a floral shop and it is slabbed to the ground and swept clean. Why not F5? Why not EF5? And two things really stuck out to us from the consensus on why not EF5. One was this building, even though it was extremely, extremely destroyed, I mean on its own, taken out of context, I think most people would agree this would be representative of an EF5 tornado; the damage to that building...If there had even been two of these side-by-side that had suffered the same fate, then maybe we could have had more confidence on that, but we didn't...But it was, to that point that we were very very close and this is probably about as close as you'll get across that threshold, without making it". In 2025, researchers with the National Severe Storms Laboratory and the University of Oklahoma's School of Meteorology published a paper to the American Meteorological Society, where they stated the Rolling Fork tornado was an "EF5 candidate" at the floral shop.
Apr 23	2026	United States	Oklahoma	Enid	0	NWS, NSSL, UIUC
2026 Enid tornado – A slow-moving, violent tornado tore a 9.5 mi (15.3 km) path from just outside Vance Air Force Base to just west of Enid Woodring Regional Airport, south of the city of Enid. This tornado was officially rated as EF4 with peak winds of 180 mph (290 km/h). However, it was noted in July 2026 that after a variety of calculations were conducted by researchers from the National Severe Storms Laboratory (NSSL) and the University of Illinois Urbana-Champaign (UIUC), it is "very highly likely" this tornado produced winds that would be classified as an EF5 tornado in the vicinity of Southgate Road. This finding was based on several engineering calculations, which included 3-dimensional vortex modeling (including vertical motions) and 3-second averaging wind speeds consistent with EF-scale values. Two researchers performed a treefall pattern analysis in this area. The first researcher found that, even with six different sets of constraints applied, all six experiments found median maximum 3-second velocities of over 205 mph (330 km/h). The second researcher used the Monte Carlo method with slightly adjusted input variables. It was found in this case that, taking the runs with the lowest 0.5% error, median estimated maximum wind velocities of 94 m/s (210 mph) were calculated. Finally, a third researcher ran simulations of an RV that wasn't found until over a month after the tornado, which was tossed 305–310 yd (279–283 m) to the northeast of its original location. Once again using the Monte Carlo method, simulations that were the closest match to this RV's displacement found maximum winds of 91–97 m/s (204–217 mph).

==== Possible F5/EF5/IF5 intensity ====
This list includes tornadoes believed or confirmed to have been at F5 or EF5 intensity. These indications can come from the United States government, Doppler on Wheels, tornado experts (i.e. Thomas P. Grazulis, Ted Fujita), or meteorological research institutions (i.e. European Severe Storms Laboratory).

Tornadoes officially rated below F5/EF5/T10 or equivalent but which may have been F5/EF5/T10+ intensity
Day	Year	Country	Subdivision	Location	Fatalities	Rated by
Jul 20	1931	Poland	Lublin Voivodeship	Lublin	6	Guminski, Taszarek, Gromadzki
1931 Lublin tornado – This tornado is officially rated F4 by ESSL and F4/F5 by Mateusz Taszarek and Jakub Gromadzki; however, the wind dynamic pressure was calculated by Romunald Guminski between 246 and 324 mph (396 and 521 km/h), potentially ranking it as an F5.
Apr 2	1957	United States	Texas	Dallas	10	Segner
Tornado outbreak sequence of April 2–5, 1957 – E. Segner estimated 302 mph (486 km/h), which is based on obliteration of a large billboard.
Aug 29	1969	China	Hebei, Tianjin	Bazhou, Tianjin	146	Chen
Trees were completely debarked, grass was scoured from the ground and numerous reinforced concrete factories were leveled. The village of Chuhegang was completely destroyed. This tornado was rated >F3, with indications of possible F4 or F5 intensity.
May 27	1973	United States	Alabama	Greensboro, Brent, Centreville, Montevallo, Columbiana, Wilsonville, Childersburg	7	NWS, Brasher
1973 Central Alabama tornado – John Brasher, a reporter and photographer for the Centreville Press, stated that as the tornado struck Main Street in Brent, "the tornado's already violent F4 winds would ramp up to, and possibly beyond, the threshold of F5 strength". The National Weather Service in Birmingham, Alabama, noted the rating for this tornado was F4 on the Fujita scale, which has a wind speed range of 207 to 260 miles per hour (333 to 418 km/h). However, the wind speeds assigned to this tornado was between 210 and 261 miles per hour (338 and 420 km/h), indicating the potential that this tornado had winds up to F5 intensity.
Apr 26	1991	United States	Oklahoma	Red Rock	0	Bluestein, DOW, Lyza, Flournoy, Alford
1991 Andover tornado outbreak – Mobile Doppler weather radar used by storm chasers indicated wind speeds in the range of the F5 threshold, with winds up to 268 mph (431 km/h). Pavement and ground scouring occurred, and a large oil rig was toppled. The tornado is officially rated F4, but is mentioned by some sources as an F5 or possible F5. This was reaffirmed in March 2024 by scientists with the National Oceanic and Atmospheric Administration and University of Oklahoma which stated 120–125 metres per second (270–280 mph; 430–450 km/h) was measured between 150–190 metres (160–210 yd) off the ground.
May 30	1998	United States	South Dakota	Spencer	6	Wurman, DOW, Lyza, Flournoy, Alford
1998 Spencer tornado – DOW recorded maximum wind speeds at 264 mph (425 km/h) at 160 ft (49 m) above ground level, which the NWS classified at almost ground level. Such wind speeds would fall well into the EF5 range on the Enhanced Fujita Scale, though the maximum damage intensity observed in the town of Spencer was F4. The town's water tower was toppled to the ground, an apartment building was leveled, and many homes were completely destroyed, a few of which were swept away. This was reaffirmed in 2024 after Anthony W. Lyza, Matthew D. Flournoy, and A. Addison Alford, researchers with the National Severe Storms Laboratory, Storm Prediction Center, CIWRO, and the University of Oklahoma's School of Meteorology, published a paper stating the radar "showed a broad swath" of wind speeds in the F4 to minimal F5 range. They went on to say, "However, no F5/EF5 damage was observed, despite winds observed well into the EF5 range".
May 3	1999	United States	Oklahoma	Mulhall	2	Lyza, Flournoy, Alford
1999 Mulhall tornado – In March 2024, Anthony W. Lyza, Matthew D. Flournoy, and A. Addison Alford, researchers with the National Severe Storms Laboratory, Storm Prediction Center, CIWRO, and the University of Oklahoma's School of Meteorology, published a paper stating 115 metres per second (260 mph; 410 km/h) was measured in the tornado only 30 metres (33 yd) off the ground.
Apr 27	2011	United States	Tennessee	Great Smoky Mountains National Park	0	Godfrey, Peterson
2011 Super Outbreak – This tornado was originally rated EF4 due to the collapse of a metal truss tower. However, the "incredible" tree damage it produced, namely knocking down almost 100% of trees in several 100x100 meter subplots, indicates EF5 intensity according to a study that aimed to estimate EF levels based on forest damage.
Apr 27	2011	United States	Georgia	Chattahoochee National Forest	1	Godfrey, Peterson
2011 Super Outbreak – Another tornado from the same study was outlined as producing EF5-level forest damage. It tracked through forests for much of its lifespan, although it was officially rated EF3 due to damage to a few buildings near the very end of its track.
May 28	2013	United States	Kansas	Bennington	0	The Weather Channel, DOW, Wurman, Kosiba, Robinson, Marshall
Tornado outbreak of May 26–31, 2013 – Officially rated EF3. However, a DOW instrument estimated winds inside the tornado at 247 mph (398 km/h), 300 ft (91 m) above the ground. According to the Joshua Wurman, Karen Kosiba, Paul Robinson, and Tim Marshall in their research, the DOW windspeed measurements were found to be 264 mph (425 km/h), 153 ft (47 m) above the ground.
Nov 17	2013	United States	Illinois	Washington	3	Roegner, Lombardo, Moon
2013 Washington, Illinois tornado – Through measurements of cycloidal surface marks produced by this tornado, wind speed estimates were calculated with the assumption that the dimensions of cycloidal markings correlate to the speed of rotation and movement of a tornado. Overall, it was calculated that the tornado may have had wind speeds of up to 231 mph (372 km/h), despite the damage survey of structures along the tornado's path resulting in wind speed estimates of just 190 mph (310 km/h), possibly as a result of the limitations of assessing structural damage in the rural areas that the tornado affected.
May 9	2016	United States	Oklahoma	Sulphur	0	NWS, Marshall
Tornado outbreak of May 7–10, 2016 – This tornado was recorded to have attained 218 mph (351 km/h) winds in an open field by RaXPol mobile radar. Several poorly-anchored homes were swept away at high-end EF3 strength, and many other outbuildings were destroyed as well. A large metal storage garage was swept away, with vehicles stored inside being thrown up to 280 yd (260 m) away. An 18-year old and his cousin were able to survive the tornado by taking shelter in an interior bathroom, which was the only standing section of the house after the tornado had impacted it.
May 24	2016	United States	Kansas	Dodge City	0	NCEI, CSWR, DOW
Tornado outbreak sequence of May 22–26, 2016 – During the initial stages of development, there was DOW data on this tornado. It intensified from 40 metres per second (89 mph; 140 km/h) to 90 metres per second (201 mph; 320 km/h) in a span of 21 seconds that lasted less than a minute at those velocities. As the tornado moved north into a housing addition just west of Dodge City, it showed multiple vortex characteristics and did EF2 damage. One person was seriously hurt in a home that was heavily damaged.
May 25	2016	United States	Kansas	Solomon, Abilene, Chapman	0	NWS
2016 Abilene–Chapman tornado – An anchor-bolted brick farm home was swept away and was ripped from its foundation so violently that part of the foundation was severely cracked, exposing the rebar, though the area surrounding the home was not swept completely clean. Vehicles and large pieces of farm machinery were thrown and mangled beyond recognition, and a section of metal railroad track was bent horizontally by the tornado. Officially rated EF4 with winds of 180 mph (290 km/h), though NWS Topeka damage surveyors later noted that based on the severity of the damage in rural areas, it "could have very well been" rated EF5 had it struck Chapman directly.
Jun 18	2017	Russia	Kurgan Oblast	Maloye Pes'yanovo	0	Chernokulsky, Shikhov, Bykov, Azhigov
Rated F4 and IF4 due to complete destruction of two log homes. Researchers at the Russian Academy of Sciences and Perm State University published a paper in the academically peer-reviewed journal Atmosphere, providing an assessment of this tornado in which they state that the tornado possessed EF5 intensity, due to it blowing down or snapping 100% of the trees in a 100-by-100-meter (110 yd) forested area.
Aug 3	2018	Canada	Manitoba	Alonsa, Silver Ridge	1	Northern Tornadoes Project
Tornadoes of 2018 – Rated EF4, with maximum windspeeds in the EF5 range. A later study, also by the Northern Tornadoes Project, determined that the tornado lofted haybales into Lake Manitoba, which they estimated required winds between 87.9 m/s (197 mph) and 127 m/s (280 mph).
Apr 13	2019	United States	Mississippi	Greenwood Springs	0	Lyza, Goudeau, Knupp
Tornado outbreak of April 13–15, 2019 – This tornado was officially rated EF2, based on an incomplete damage survey from the National Weather Service, where 8.7 miles (14 km) of the tornado's track was unable to be officially surveyed. A NEXRAD radar only 980 yards (900 m) away from the tornado documented radial velocities of up to 182 mph (293 km/h). A research team, from the University of Oklahoma, National Severe Storms Laboratory, and University of Alabama in Huntsville was funded by the National Oceanic and Atmospheric Administration to investigate the unsurveyed portion of the tornado track. In their survey, published in Monthly Weather Review, they note that the tornado "produced forest devastation and electrical infrastructure damage up to at least EF4 intensity" and conclude by writing that "the Greenwood Springs event was a violent tornado, potentially even EF5 intensity."
Aug 7	2020	Canada	Manitoba	Scarth	2	Northern Tornadoes Project
Tornadoes of 2020 – An EF3 tornado was determined to have likely lofted two vehicles over 1 m (1.1 yd) into the air and between 30 and 100 m (33 and 109 yd) laterally. Researchers with the Northern Tornadoes Project found a median wind speed of 110 m/s (250 mph) would be required to achieve this, well above the criteria for EF5 intensity.
Dec 10	2021	United States	Tennessee, Kentucky	Woodland Mills, Cayce, Mayfield, Princeton, Dawson Springs, Bremen, McDaniels	57	Marshall, Wienhoff, Smith, Wielgos
2021 Western Kentucky tornado – A long-tracked wedge spawned by the Quad-State supercell, that damaged, destroyed, or obliterated thousands of structures along a path of 165.6 mi (266.5 km) while moving at 60 mph (97 km/h). In 2022, Timothy Marshall, a meteorologist, and structural and forensic engineer, Christine L. Wielgos, a meteorologist at the National Weather Service of Paducah, & Brian E. Smith, a meteorologist at the National Weather Service of Omaha, published a damage survey of portions of the tornado's track, particularly through Mayfield and Dawson Springs. At the end of the report, they said, "the tornado damage rating might have been higher had more wind resistant structures been encountered. Also, the fast forward speed of the tornado had little 'dwell' time of strong winds over a building and thus, the damage likely would have been more severe if the tornado were slower".
Jul 1	2023	Canada	Alberta	Didsbury	0	Northern Tornadoes Project
Tornadoes of 2023 – This EF4 tornado moved a combine harvester 80 to 100 m (87 to 109 yd) from its original position. Researchers with the Northern Tornadoes Project determined the harvester was likely lofted roughly 1.26 m (1.38 yd) into the air, with median estimated winds of 118 m/s (260 mph), above EF5 criteria.
May 21	2024	United States	Iowa	Greenfield	5	DOW
Greenfield tornado – A DOW positioned just east of Greenfield measured wind velocities of 263–271 mph (423–436 km/h) in a narrow region on the right side of the tornado as it passed through town. These velocities were later estimated to have been 309–318 mph (497–512 km/h) at ground level, among the highest winds ever determined using DOW data and well above EF5 criteria. Given the tornado's small size and fast forward speed as it passed through Greenfield, these peak wind speeds were likely experienced in less than a second at specific locations in its path.

==== Possible F5/EF5/IF5 tornadoes with no official rating ====
Many other tornadoes have never been formally rated by an official government source but have nonetheless been described as F5/EF5/T10+ or equivalent, often by independent studies. Most of these tornadoes occurred prior to 1950, before tornadoes were rated according to standardized damage assessments, and their unofficial classifications as F5/EF5/T10+ or equivalent have been made in retrospect, largely on the basis of photographic analysis and eyewitness accounts. A few, such as the Tri-State Tornado of 1925, are widely accepted as F5/EF5/T10+ tornadoes, despite not being rated as such in official records.

This is a dynamic list and may not meet certain standards for completeness. You can assist by participating in discussions about tornadoes for this list.

Tornadoes with no official rating, but were possibly F5/EF5/IF5
Day	Year	Country	Subdivision	Location	Fatalities	Notes	Rated F5/EF5 by
Apr 8	1838	India	West Bengal	Kolkata	215	Much of the eastern half of the city was reported as total destruction, in the particular form of brick buildings being transformed into piles of dust. Grass was scoured from the ground. Coconut and date trees were debarked or uprooted and thrown up to 300 ft (91 m) from their original points. A peepul tree was debranched and torn out of the ground. Additionally, at least five boat wrecks were produced.	Finch
Apr 24	1880	United States	Illinois	West Prairie, Christian County	6	Many "well built" homes were leveled and farms vanished. Its victims (both people and cattle) were reportedly carried up to .5 mi (0.80 km). This is the earliest estimated F5 that can be verified in the U.S. according to Grazulis (The 1953 Waco tornado is the earliest officially rated). The F5 rating is widely accepted.	NWS, NCDC, Grazulis
Jun 12	1881	United States	Missouri	Hopkins	2	Tornado outbreak of June 1881 – Two farms were completely swept away. May have reached F5 intensity according to Grazulis.	NCDC, Grazulis
Jul 15	1881	United States	Minnesota	Renville County	20	1881 Minnesota tornado outbreak – According to Grazulis, this tornado was "probably" an F5. Severe damage occurred in Renville County where five farms were completely swept away.	Grazulis
Jun 17	1882	United States	Iowa	Grinnell	68	1882 Grinnell tornado – Sixteen farms were blown away and the town of Grinnell was devastated, as well as the Grinnell College campus. Debris was carried 100 mi (160 km). Caused 68 fatalities according to Grazulis.	NWS, NCDC, Grazulis
Aug 21	1883	United States	Minnesota	Rochester	37	1883 Rochester tornado – Numerous homes in Rochester were destroyed, some of which were oblitereted and swept away with the debris finely granulated. Trees were completely debarked, and grass and shrubbery was scoured from the ground. A large metal railroad bridge was completely destroyed and mangled. At least 10 farms outside the city were also completely leveled and swept away, with little debris recovered at some of them.	NWS, Grazulis
Feb 19	1884	United States	Georgia	Waleska, Cagle, Tate	22	Enigma tornado outbreak – Numerous large, well-built homes belonging to "prominent" owners were swept away in Cagle. The community would be left completely destroyed, with the only evidence of homes being there were scattered pieces of buildings and broken furniture. Grazulis would indicate that the destruction within Cagle may have been F5, however he would question the construction quality of the homes.	Grazulis
Apr 1	1884	United States	Indiana	Oakville	8	Among contemporary meteorologists, this was considered one of the most intense tornadoes observed up to that time. Parts of Oakville "vanished", with house debris scattered for miles.	NWS, NCDC, Grazulis
Jun 15	1892	United States	Minnesota	Faribault County, Freeborn County, Steele County	12	1892 Southern Minnesota tornado – Entire farms were obliterated, and house timbers were embedded into the ground 3 mi (4.8 km) away from the foundations.	Grazulis
May 22	1893	United States	Wisconsin	Willow Springs	3	Two farm complexes were completely swept away.	NCDC, Grazulis
Jul 6	1893	United States	Iowa	Pomeroy	71	1893 Pomeroy tornado – Well-built homes were swept away in four counties with F5 damage in the town of Pomeroy. Grass was scoured from the ground, and a metal bridge was torn from its supports. A well pump and 40 ft (12 m) of piping were pulled out of the ground.	NWS, NCDC, Grazulis
Sep 21	1894	United States	Iowa	Kossuth County	43	Five farms and a home were swept away, leaving little trace.	NWS, NCDC, Grazulis
May 1	1895	United States	Kansas	Harvey County	8	Farms "entirely vanished", with debris carried for miles.	NWS, NCDC, Grazulis
May 3	1895	United States	Iowa	Sioux County	9	Farms were swept away, with debris carried for miles.	NWS, Grazulis
May 15	1896	United States	Texas	Sherman	73	1896 Sherman tornado – This was one of the most intense tornadoes of the 19th century according to Grazulis. "Extraordinary" damage occurred to farms and 20 homes that were obliterated and swept away. An iron-beam bridge was torn apart and scattered, with one of the beams deeply embedded into the ground. Trees were reduced to debarked stumps, and grass was scoured from lawns in town as well. Several headstones at a cemetery were shattered or thrown up to 250 yards through the air, and a trunk lid from Sherman was found 35 miles away. Reliable reports said that numerous bodies were carried hundreds of yards, and that multiple deaths occurred in 17 different families; seven deaths were in one family alone.	NWS, NCDC, Grazulis
May 17	1896	United States	Kansas, Nebraska	Washington County, Marshall County, Nemaha County, Brown County, Richardson County	25	Tornado outbreak sequence of May 1896 – An opera house in Seneca was swept away, along with some farms. Entire farms were reportedly swept clean of debris, leaving the areas "bare as the prairie". Damage estimated at $400,000.	NWS, Grazulis
May 25	1896	United States	Michigan	Ortonville, Oakwood	47	Tornado outbreak sequence of May 1896 – Houses and farms were leveled and swept away, with debris carried up to 12 mi (19 km) away. Trees were completely debarked, with even small twigs stripped bare in some cases.	NWS, NCDC, Grazulis
May 18	1898	United States	Wisconsin	Marathon County	12	Twelve farms were flattened. Timber losses totaled 100 million board feet.	Grazulis
Jun 11	1899	United States	Nebraska, Iowa	Salix	5	This tornado impacted several farms, including one where a "fine new residence" was swept completely away.	NCDC
Jun 12	1899	United States	Wisconsin	St. Croix County, New Richmond	117	1899 New Richmond tornado – This tornado devastated New Richmond, leveling or sweeping away many homes and businesses. A large section of the town was reduced to nothing but scattered debris and house foundations. The three-story brick Nicollet Hotel was completely leveled to the ground. Numerous trees were completely debarked and shorn of their branches. A 3,000-pound (1,400 kg) safe was carried a full block.	Grazulis
May 10	1905	United States	Oklahoma	Snyder	97	1905 Snyder tornado – The town of Snyder was devastated, with many structures swept away. A piano was found in a field 8 mi (13 km) outside town, and debris was carried 60 mi (97 km) away.	NWS, NCDC, Grazulis
Jun 5	1905	United States	Michigan	Colling, Shabbona	5	Three farms were "wiped out of existence" with only "bits of kindling" remaining on the foundations. A new iron bridge over the Cass River was reportedly blown away and never found.	Grazulis
Jun 5	1906	United States	Iowa, Minnesota, Wisconsin	Houston County	4	A farm was completely leveled, and a child was reportedly carried .5 mi (0.80 km) away.	NCDC
Apr 23	1908	United States	Nebraska	Cuming County, Thurston County	3	1908 Dixie tornado outbreak – A well-built two-story home was swept away.	NCDC, Grazulis
May 12	1908	United States	Iowa	Fremont County, Page County	0	Five farms had all buildings swept away, homes were "absolutely reduced to kindling" and lumber was scattered for miles.	NCDC, Grazulis
Jun 5	1908	United States	Nebraska	Fillmore County	11	Farms vanished, with little left to indicate farmsteads ever existed at some locations.	NCDC, Grazulis
Apr 20	1912	United States	Oklahoma	Kingfisher County	2	Tornado outbreak of April 20–22, 1912 - Entire farms were swept away.	NCDC
Apr 27	1912	United States	Oklahoma	Kiowa County, Canadian County	15	This tornado is only listed as an F5 by a NCDC technical report, and is not listed at all by Grazulis or any other sources, and is therefore a possible typographical error in the report.	NCDC
Jun 15	1912	United States	Missouri	Creighton	5	Two large homes were completely swept away.	Grazulis
Mar 23	1913	United States	Nebraska	Omaha	113	Tornado outbreak sequence of March 1913 – Photo analysis by Grazulis revealed possible F5 damage with many empty foundations throughout Omaha, though it is uncertain if this was a result of the tornado or cleanup efforts following the event. An F4 rating was assigned due to the uncertainty.	Grazulis
Jun 11	1915	United States	Kansas	Mullinville	0	One entire farm was swept completely away. Three mules were reportedly carried 2 mi (3.2 km) away.	NWS, NCDC, Grazulis
May 25	1917	United States	Kansas	Andale, Sedgwick	23	Tornado outbreak sequence of May 25 – June 1, 1917 – Many structures were swept away, and trees were debarked. The F5 rating is widely accepted.	NWS, NCDC, Grazulis
May 26	1917	United States	Illinois	Pike, Greene, Macoupin, Montgomery, Christian, Shelby, Coles	101	Tornado outbreak sequence of May 25 – June 1, 1917 – J. P. Carey estimated winds of over 400 mph (640 km/h). This tornado family retrospectively estimated to have been an F4.	Carey
Jun 5	1917	United States	Kansas	Kiro, Elmont	9	The tornado hit only 8 mi (13 km) northwest of downtown Topeka. In the damaged area, homes and farms were swept completely away. A schoolhouse was reduced to an empty stone foundation. Trees were debarked, and heavy farm machinery was carried for miles. Rated F4 by Grazulis.	NCDC
May 21	1918	United States	Iowa	Crawford County, Greene County	6	At least two farms were swept away, and house foundations were left bare. Mattresses from the homes were transported 2 mi (3.2 km).	NWS, NCDC, Grazulis
May 21	1918	United States	Iowa	Boone County, Story County	9	A large tornado completely swept away two entire farms. Mentioned as a possible F5 by Grazulis.	Grazulis
Jun 22	1919	United States	Minnesota	Fergus Falls	59	1919 Fergus Falls tornado – This tornado produced extreme damage in Fergus Falls. A three-block-wide swath was leveled, with some homes swept away. Several summer homes were swept away into Lake Alice. A train station was swept away, railroad tracks were ripped from the ground, and a large three-story hotel was completely leveled. Numerous small trees were completely debarked.	NCDC, Grazulis
Mar 28	1920	United States	Indiana, Ohio	Jackson Township, West Liberty, Van Wert	17	1920 Palm Sunday tornado outbreak – Farms were leveled and swept away in Indiana and Ohio. Some homes had their floors dislodged and moved some distance. Mentioned as a possible F5 by Grazulis.	NWS, Grazulis
Jul 22	1920	Canada	Saskatchewan	Frobisher, Alameda	4	"Splendid homes" were swept away and "reduced to splinters". Bodies were found up to 1 mi (1.6 km) away.	Grazulis
Apr 15	1921	United States	Texas, Arkansas	Harrison County, Pike County, Hempstead County	62	This tornado family tracked for 112 mi (180 km), killing at least 59 people, and reached a peak width of 2,000 yards (1,800 m; 1.1 mi; 1.8 km). Many homes were leveled, some of which were swept away and scattered across fields. A large concrete fireplace was shifted 3 ft (0.91 m), and a vehicle was thrown 200 yd (180 m) and partially buried into the soil. Tornado is not listed as an F5 by Grazulis.	NCDC
Mar 11	1923	United States	Tennessee	Pinson	20	An entire section of the town was swept away. Bodies or body parts were found up to 1 mi (1.6 km) away. This is the first of the six potential F5/EF5 intensity tornadoes to hit Tennessee on record.	NCDC, Grazulis
May 14	1923	United States	Texas	Big Spring	23	A large ranch home and farms were swept away.	Grazulis
Jun 24	1923	United States	North Dakota	Hettinger	8	Some ranch homes had possible F5 damage.	Grazulis
Sep 21	1924	United States	Wisconsin	Clark County, Taylor County	18	20 farms were destroyed, some of which were obliterated. An entire wall of a home was carried for 14 mi (23 km). Considered to be a probable F5 by Grazulis.	Grazulis
Mar 18	1925	United States	Missouri, Illinois, Indiana	Ellington, Annapolis, Biehle, Gorham, Murphysboro, De Soto, West Frankfort, Parrish, Griffin, Owensville, Princeton	695	1925 Tri-State tornado – This was the deadliest and longest-tracked single tornado in U.S. history, producing the highest tornado-related death toll in a single U.S. city (234, at Murphysboro, Illinois) and the largest such toll in a U.S. school (33, at De Soto, Illinois). Thousands of structures were destroyed, with hundreds of homes swept away along the path, especially in Illinois and Indiana. The towns of Murphysboro, West Frankfort, Gorham, and Griffin were devastated, along with numerous other small towns and communities. Gorham and Griffin were destroyed entirely, with every single structure in Gorham leveled or swept away. Trees were debarked, debris was finely granulated, and deep ground scouring was noted in several areas as well. A Model T Ford was thrown a long distance and stripped, railroad tracks were ripped from the ground at multiple locations along the path, and a large, 80 foot coal tipple weighing hundreds of tons was blown over and rolled. The F5 rating is widely accepted.	NWS, NCDC, Grazulis
Mar 18	1925	United States	Tennessee, Kentucky	Buck Lodge (TN), Keytown (TN), Oak Grove (TN), Angeltown (TN), Liberty (TN), Holland (KY), Beaumont (KY)	41	Tri-State tornado outbreak – This event was believed to have been a tornado family and is regarded as one of the most powerful tornadoes to affect Middle Tennessee. Bodies were mangled and hurled hundreds of yards, homes were obliterated, and severe ground scouring occurred, reducing the ground into "muddy bog". The tornado may have reached F5 intensity.	NWS
Jun 3	1925	United States	Iowa	Pottawattamie County, Harrison County	0	Nineteen buildings on two farms reportedly "vanished". This tornado took nearly the same path as the next one, below. It is described as a "possible" F5.	Grazulis
Jun 3	1925	United States	Iowa	Pottawattamie County, Harrison County	1	Parts of two farms and some homes swept away, but they may have been hit by both tornadoes, thus the uncertainty of a possible F5.	Grazulis
Apr 12	1927	United States	Texas	Rocksprings	74	1927 Rocksprings tornado – This massive tornado swept away or leveled 235 out of 247 structures, more than 90% of the town, killing or injuring a third of the population. Many of the structures were reduced to bare foundations, leaving "no trace of lumber or contents." Acres of ground were "swept bare" in some parts of town.	NWS, Grazulis
May 7	1927	United States	Kansas	Barber County, McPherson County	10	Tornado outbreak of May 1927 – Many farms were destroyed and some were swept completely away.	NWS, NCDC, Grazulis
Jul 16	1927	United States	Kansas	Dunlap, Lebo	3	Two farms incurred possible F5-level damage.	Grazulis
Sep 13	1928	United States	Nebraska	Cuming County, Thurston County, Dakota County	5	Three rural schools houses were obliterated, at least one was "swept entirely away". Possible F5 damage, according to Grazulis, was in an area where two farms "were completely leveled". 66 homes and at least another 450 buildings were damaged or destroyed. The tornado caused $1 million in damages.	Grazulis
Apr 10	1929	United States	Arkansas	Sneed	23	Sneed Tornado – This tornado is considered the only F5 on record in Arkansas. It destroyed the Sneed community, reduced homes to "splinters", and made a "clean sweep" of the area. Huge trees were snapped or torn apart.	NWS, Grazulis
May 22	1933	United States	Nebraska	Tryon	8	Two farms were swept away.	NCDC, Grazulis
Jul 1	1935	Canada	Saskatchewan	Benson	1	Three farms were completely swept away, with debris and farm machinery scattered for miles. Considered to be a probable F5 by Grazulis.	Grazulis
Apr 5	1936	United States	Mississippi	Tupelo	216	1936 Tupelo–Gainesville tornado outbreak – This tornado leveled and swept away many large and well-constructed houses, killing entire families. A concrete war monument was toppled and broken, with nearby brick gate posts snapped off at the base. Granulated structural debris was scattered and wind-rowed for miles east of the city. Pine needles were reportedly driven into tree trunks as well.	NWS, Grazulis
Apr 26	1938	United States	Nebraska	Oshkosh	3	A school disintegrated, and two farms were swept away. Dead bodies were carried .25 mi (0.40 km) away.	NCDC, Grazulis
Jun 10	1938	United States	Texas	Clyde	14	All nine homes in a small subdivision "literally vanished", with bodies carried up to .5 mi (0.80 km) away. A car engine, found nearby, was carried for a similar distance. 19 railroad cars were "tossed like toys".	Grazulis
Apr 14	1939	United States	Oklahoma, Kansas	Woodward County, Barber County	7	Homes and entire farms were swept away, and cars were carried for hundreds of yards.	NCDC, Grazulis
Jun 18	1939	United States	Minnesota	Hennepin County, Anoka County	9	Homes were swept away in Champlin and Anoka. A car was tossed 300 yd (270 m) and smashed to pieces. As the tornado crossed the Mississippi River, witnesses reported that so much water was sucked into the air that the riverbed was briefly exposed, and that the flow of water was stopped until the tornado reached the opposite bank. Tornado is not listed as an F5 by Grazulis.	NCDC
Apr 7	1940	United States	Louisiana	Amite	3	This tornado produced possible F5 damage to a "large new home", killing the couple inside.	Grazulis
Mar 16	1942	United States	Illinois	Peoria County, Marshall County	8	Tornado outbreak of March 16–17, 1942 – Many homes were swept away in the town of Lacon, Illinois, and a rural farmhouse sustained F5-level damage.	NWS, NCDC, Grazulis
Apr 29	1942	United States	Kansas	Oberlin	15	Three farms were obliterated, with all buildings and several inches of topsoil swept away. Debris from homes was granulated into splinters "no larger than match sticks" and trees were debarked. Mutilated bodies were found up to 0.25 mi (400 m).	NWS, NCDC, Grazulis
Jun 17	1944	United States	South Dakota, Minnesota	Wilmot	8	1944 South Dakota–Minnesota tornado outbreak - Farms were swept away with no visible debris left.	NWS, Grazulis
Jun 22	1944	United States	Wisconsin, Illinois	Grant County, Stephenson County	9	This long-tracked tornado or tornado family destroyed many homes in both Wisconsin and Illinois. Hundreds of cattle were killed. Rated F4 by Grazulis.	NCDC
Apr 12	1945	United States	Oklahoma	Antlers	69	Six hundred buildings were destroyed, and some areas were swept clean of all debris. The F5 rating is widely accepted.	NCDC, Grazulis
Apr 9	1947	United States	Texas, Oklahoma	Glazier, Higgins, Woodward	181	1947 Glazier–Higgins–Woodward tornado – Several towns were partially or totally destroyed. Most structures in Glazier were swept away, where shrubbery was debarked, ground scouring occurred, and vehicles were thrown hundreds of yards. In Higgins, a 4,500 kilograms (9,900 lb) lathe was ripped from its anchors and broken in half. A 40,000 lb (18,000 kg) boiler tank in Woodward was thrown a block and a half. The F5 rating is widely accepted.	NWS, NCDC, Grazulis
Apr 29	1947	United States	Missouri	Worth	14	Most of Worth was destroyed. Half of a brick building remained standing in the village. Considered to be a possible F5 by Grazulis.	Grazulis
May 31	1947	United States	Oklahoma	Leedey	6	This tornado reportedly left more intense damage than the previous event did in Woodward. Many structures were swept away, leaving no debris or grass in some areas. Yards at some residences were stripped of their lawns and all vegetation, and several inches of topsoil were removed as well. The F5 rating is widely accepted, though the tornado was very slow-moving, which may have exacerbated the level of destruction to some extent.	NWS, Grazulis
May 21	1949	United States	Illinois, Indiana	Palestine	4	A restaurant was leveled, and cars in the parking lot were thrown up to 300 yd (270 m) away from where they originated. Rated F4 by Grazulis.	NCDC
Jan 1	1970	Australia	New South Wales	Bulahdelah	0	Bulahdelah tornado – Never officially rated, but is thought to have reached F4 or F5 intensity. Left a damage path 21 km (13 mi) long and 1–1.6 km (0.62–0.99 mi) wide through the Bulahdelah State Forest. According to reports, the tornado threw a tractor weighing 2,000 kilograms (4,400 lb) 100 m (330 ft) through the air, stripping it down to frame and depositing upside-down. It is estimated that the tornado destroyed over one million trees.	Pending

== See also ==
- Outline of tornadoes
- Tornado intensity
- Lists of tornadoes and tornado outbreaks
  - List of F4, EF4, and IF4 tornadoes
    - List of F4 and EF4 tornadoes (2010–2019)
    - List of F4, EF4, and IF4 tornadoes (2020–present)
  - List of F3, EF3, and IF3 tornadoes (2020–present)
- List of tornadoes striking downtown areas of large cities
- Tornado myths

== Sources ==
- Bluestein, Howard B. (1999). Tornado alley: monster storms of the Great Plains. New York, NY: Oxford University Press. pp. 128–129. ISBN 978-0-19-530711-5.
- —; Snyder, Jeffrey C.; Houser, Jana B. (2015). "A Multiscale Overview of the El Reno, Oklahoma, Tornadic Supercell of 31 May 2013". Weather and Forecasting. 30 (3): 525–552. Bibcode:2015WtFor..30..525B. doi:10.1175/WAF-D-14-00152.1.
- Brooks, Harold E. (April 2004). "On the Relationship of Tornado Path Length and Width to Intensity". Weather and Forecasting. 19 (2): 310–19. Bibcode:2004WtFor..19..310B. doi:10.1175/1520-0434(2004)019<0310:OTROTP>2.0.CO;2.
- Chernokulsky, Alexander; Shikhov, Andrey (July 15, 2018). "1984 Ivanovo tornado outbreak: Determination of actual tornado tracks with satellite data". Atmospheric Research. 207: 111–121. Bibcode:2018AtmRe.207..111C. doi:10.1016/j.atmosres.2018.02.011. ISSN 0169-8095. S2CID 125778632.
- —; Shikhov, Andrey; Bykov, Alexey; Azhigov, I.O. (October 2020). "Satellite-Based Study and Numerical Forecasting of Two Tornado Outbreaks in the Ural Region in June 2017". Atmosphere. 11 (11). 1146. Bibcode:2020Atmos..11.1146C. doi:10.3390/atmos11111146.
- Cook, A. R.; Schaefer, J. T. (August 2008). "The Relation of El Niño–Southern Oscillation (ENSO) to Winter Tornado Outbreaks". Monthly Weather Review. 136 (8): 3135. Bibcode:2008MWRv..136.3121C. doi:10.1175/2007MWR2171.1.
- Edwards, Roger, ed. (March 19, 2021). "F5 and EF5 Tornadoes of the United States, 1950-present". The Online Tornado FAQ. Norman, Oklahoma: Storm Prediction Center.
- —; LaDue, James G.; Ferree, John T.; et al. (May 2013). "Tornado intensity estimation: past, present, and future". Bulletin of the American Meteorological Society. 94 (5). Boston: American Meteorological Society: 642. Bibcode:2013BAMS...94..641E. doi:10.1175/BAMS-D-11-00006.1.
- —; Elliott, Matthew S.; Marsh, Patrick T.; Speheger, Douglas A. (2022). Errors, Oddities and Artifacts in U.S. Tornado Data, 1995-2021 (PDF). 30th Conference Severe Local Storms, Santa Fe, NM. pp. 1–10.
- Feuerstein, Bernold; Kühne, Thilo (September 2015). A violent tornado in mid-18th century Germany: the Genzmer Report. ECSS 2015 - European Conference on Severe Storms. Vol. 8. Wiener Neustadt, Austria: European Severe Storms Laboratory. doi:10.13140/RG.2.1.3733.8085.
- Frankenfield, H. C. (June 1917). "The Tornadoes and Windstorms of May 25–June 6, 1917" (PDF). Monthly Weather Review. 45 (6). Washington, D.C.: United States Weather Bureau: 291–298. Bibcode:1917MWRv...45..291F. doi:10.1175/1520-0493(1917)45<291:TTAWOM>2.0.CO;2.
- Fujita, T. Theodore (February 1971). Proposed Characterization of Tornadoes and Hurricanes by Area and Intensity. Texas Tech University Southwest Collection/Special Collections Library (Technical report). Satellite and Mesometeorology Research Project Research Paper No. 91. hdl:10605/261875.
- — (1973). "Tornadoes Around the World". Weatherwise. 26 (2): 56–83. Bibcode:1973Weawi..26b..56F. doi:10.1080/00431672.1973.9931633.
- —; Abbey, Jr., Robert F. (1983) [1981]. "Chapter 3: Tornadoes: The Tornado Outbreak of 3–4 April 1974". In Kessler, Edwin (ed.). The Thunderstorm in Human Affairs (2nd ed.). Norman, Oklahoma: University of Oklahoma Press. pp. 37–66.
- —; Stiegler, D. J., eds. (June 1984). "Tornado Outbreak in the Upper Midwest on June 7-8, 1984". Storm Data. 26 (6). Asheville, North Carolina: United States Department of Commerce: 9–17.
- —; Stiegler, D. J., eds. (May 1985). "Tornado Outbreak in the United States and Canada on May 31, 1985". Storm Data. 27 (5). Asheville, North Carolina: United States Department of Commerce: 5–16.
- — (1991). "Plainfield tornado of August 28, 1990". hdl:10605/262035.
- — (1993). "Plainfield tornado of August 28, 1990". In Church, C.; Burgess, D.; Doswell, C.; Davies-Jones, R. (eds.). The Tornado: Its Structure, Dynamics, Prediction, and Hazards. Geophysical Monograph Series. Vol. 79. American Geophysical Union. pp. 1–17. Bibcode:1993GMS....79....1F. doi:10.1029/gm079p0001. ISBN 978-0-87590-038-4.
- Godfrey, Christopher M.; Peterson, Chris J. (February 1, 2017). "Estimating Enhanced Fujita Scale Levels Based on Forest Damage Severity". Weather and Forecasting. 32 (1): 243–252. Bibcode:2017WtFor..32..243G. doi:10.1175/WAF-D-16-0104.1. ISSN 1520-0434.
- Golden, Joseph H.; Purcell, Daniel (1978). "Life Cycle of the Union City, Oklahoma Tornado and Comparison with Waterspouts". Monthly Weather Review. 106 (1): 3–11. Bibcode:1978MWRv..106....3G. doi:10.1175/1520-0493(1978)106<0003:LCOTUC>2.0.CO;2. ISSN 1520-0493.
- Gordon, John D.; Boyd, Bobby; Rose, Mark A.; et al. (2000). "The Forgotten F5: The Lawrence County Supercell During the Middle Tennessee Tornado Outbreak of 16 April 1998" (PDF). National Weather Digest. 24 (4). National Weather Association: 3–10. Archived from the original (PDF) on 2012-12-18. "The authors sent a detailed letter to the SPC recommending the two tornadoes from 1974, and the 1952 tornado mentioned above, be downgraded to F4. The SPC agreed to all three of these changes. The SPC database now reflects the conclusions of Professor Fujita's map of 1974, and Grazulis 1952 tornado report (1993). ... The authors suggested that the three former F5 tornadoes in Tennessee should be reclassified as F4. These changes have been adopted, making the 16 April 1998 Lawrence County tornado the only documented F5 in the history of Tennessee."
- Grazulis, Thomas P. (May 1984). Violent Tornado Climatography, 1880–1982. OSTI (Technical report). NUREG. Washington, D.C.: Nuclear Regulatory Commission. OSTI 7099491. CR-3670.
- — (November 1990). Significant Tornadoes 1880–1989. Vol. 2. St. Johnsbury, Vermont: The Tornado Project of Environmental Films. ISBN 1-879362-02-3.
- — (July 1993). Significant Tornadoes 1680–1991: A Chronology and Analysis of Events. St. Johnsbury, Vermont: The Tornado Project of Environmental Films. ISBN 1-879362-03-1.
- — (2001a). The Tornado: Nature's Ultimate Windstorm. Norman, Oklahoma: University of Oklahoma Press. ISBN 0-8061-3258-2.
- — (2001b). F5-F6 Tornadoes. St. Johnsbury, Vermont: The Tornado Project of Environmental Films.
- — (April 2003). The Tornado: Nature's Ultimate Windstorm. The University of Oklahoma Press. ISBN 978-0-8061-3538-0.
- Hickmon, W. C. (April 1921). "Tornadoes of April 15, 1921, in Arkansas and Texas". Monthly Weather Review. 49 (4). Little Rock, Arkansas: United States Weather Bureau: 194–196. Bibcode:1921MWRv...49..194H. doi:10.1175/1520-0493(1921)49<194:TOAIAA>2.0.CO;2.
- Hovde, M. R. (June 1939). "The Champlin-Anoka, Minnesota Tornado". Monthly Weather Review. 67 (6). Minneapolis, Minnesota: United States Weather Bureau: 176–178. Bibcode:1939MWRv...67..176H. doi:10.1175/1520-0493(1939)67<176:tcmt>2.0.co;2.
- Jarboe, J. H. (1927). "The Rocksprings, Texas, Tornado, April 12, 1927". Monthly Weather Review. 55 (4). San Antonio, Texas: United States Weather Bureau: 182–183. Bibcode:1927MWRv...55..182J. doi:10.1175/1520-0493(1927)55<182:TRTTA>2.0.CO;2.
- Johns, Robert H.; Burgess, D. W.; Doswell III, C. A.; et al. (2013). Edwards, Roger (ed.). "The 1925 Tri-State Tornado Damage Path and Associated Storm System" (PDF). e-Journal of Severe Storms Meteorology. 8 (2): 1–33. doi:10.55599/ejssm.v8i2.47. S2CID 107678390.
- Jordan, Charles (1987). Jordan, Teofista A. (ed.). April 3, 1974: A Night to Remember (PDF). Moulton, Alabama: Southern Printing. Archived from the original (PDF) on 2016-03-03 – via National Weather Service.
- Karstens, Christopher D.; Gallus, W. A. Jr.; Sarkar, Parka; Marshall, Timothy (November 7, 2012). Supplemental Damage Indicators Discovered in Recent Strong Tornadoes. 26th Conference on Severe Local Storms. American Meteorological Society.
- Ladue, James G.; Marshall, Timothy P.; Ortega, Kiel L.; Stumpf, Gregory J. (November 7, 2012). Performance of residences and shelters in the Oklahoma tornadoes of 24 May 2011. 26th Conference on Severe Local Storms. American Meteorological Society.
- Lott, Neal; McCown, Sam; Ross, Tom (August 2000) [1999]. 1998-1999 Tornadoes and a Long-Term U.S. Tornado Climatology (PDF) (Technical report). National Climatic Data Center Technical Report. Asheville, North Carolina: National Climatic Data Center. 99-02.
- Lyza, Anthony W.; Goudeau, Barrett T.; Knupp, Kevin R. (2022). "Damage Analysis and Close-Range Radar Observations of the 13 April 2019 Greenwood Springs, Mississippi, Tornado during VORTEX-SE Meso18-19". Monthly Weather Review. 150 (7): 1873–1893. Bibcode:2022MWRv..150.1873L. doi:10.1175/MWR-D-21-0281.1.
- Marshall, Timothy P.; Jungbluth, Karl A.; Baca, Abigail (August 2008). The Parkersburg, IA Tornado: 25 May 2008 (PDF). 24th Conference on Severe Local Storms. Savannah, GA.
- —; McCarthy, Daniel; LaDue, James (August 2008). Damage survey of the Greensburg, KS tornado (PDF). 24th Conference on Severe Local Storms. Savannah, GA.
- McCarthy, Patrick J.; Carlsen, D.; Slipec, J. (October 29, 2008). Elie, Manitoba, Canada, June 22, 2007: Canada's first F5 totnado (PDF). 24th Conference on Severe Local Storms.
- McCaul, Eugene W.; Knupp, Kevin R.; Darden, Chris; Laws, Kevin (November 7, 2012). Extreme damage incidents in the 27 April 2011 tornado superoutbreak (PDF). 26th Conference on Severe Local Storms.
- McDonald, James R. (January 2001). "T. Theodore Fujita: His Contribution to Tornado Knowledge through Damage Documentation and the Fujita Scale". Bulletin of the American Meteorological Society. 82 (1). American Meteorological Society: 63–72. Bibcode:2001BAMS...82...63M. doi:10.1175/1520-0477(2001)000<0063:TTFHCT>2.3.CO;2.
- Mehta, Kishor C.; McDonald, James R.; Mirror, Joseph E.; et al. (October 1971). "IV. Windborne Objects and Missile Damage" (PDF). Response of Structural Systems to the Lubbock Storm (PDF) (Technical report). Storm Research Report. Lubbock, Texas: Texas Tech University. 03, The Lubbock Storm. Archived (PDF) from the original on 2017-03-02.
- Mitchell, Charles L. (April 1920). "Tornadoes of March 28, in Northeastern Illinois". Monthly Weather Review. 28 (4). Chicago, Illinois: United States Weather Bureau: 191–196. Bibcode:1920MWRv...48..191M. doi:10.1175/1520-0493(1920)48<191b:TOMINI>2.0.CO;2.
- O'Toole, John M. (1993). Tornado! 84 Minutes, 94 Lives. Worcester, Massachusetts: DATABooks. ISBN 0-9636277-0-8.
- Ortega, Kiel L.; Bluestein, H.; Burgess, D. W.; Garfield, G. S.; LaDue, J. G.; Manross, K. L.; Smith, B. R.; Smith, R.; Smith, T. M.; Snyder, J. C.; Stumpf, G. J. (January 25, 2012). Overview of the 24 May 2011 tornado outbreak. 92nd American Meteorological Society Annual Meeting (January 22–26, 2012).
- —; Burgess, D. W.; Garfield, G. S.; et al. (February 5, 2014). Damage Survey and Analysis of the 20 May 2013 Newcastle-Moore, OK, EF-5 Tornado. 94th American Meteorological Society Annual Meeting. American Meteorological Society.
  - "(Handout)" (PDF).
  - "(Manuscript)" (PDF).
- Ostuno, E. J. (2008). Roger Edwards (ed.). "A Case Study in Forensic Meteorology: Investigating the 3 April 1956 Tornadoes in Western Lower Michigan" (PDF). e-Journal of Severe Storms Meteorology. 3 (1). Norman, Oklahoma: 1–33. doi:10.55599/ejssm.v3i1.14. S2CID 109690212.
- Piner, H. L. (1896). Sherman's Black Friday; May 15th, 1896: A History of the Great Sherman Tornado. Sherman, Texas: Register Printing House.
- Seeley, Mark W. (2006). Minnesota Weather Almanac. Minnesota Historical Society press. ISBN 0-87351-554-4.
- Snyder, Jeffrey C.; Bluestein, Howard B. (August 1, 2014). "Some Considerations for the Use of High-Resolution Mobile Radar Data in Tornado Intensity Determination". Weather and Forecasting. 29 (4): 799–827. Bibcode:2014WtFor..29..799S. doi:10.1175/WAF-D-14-00026.1. S2CID 122669043.
- Stevenson, Sarah A.; Miller, Connell S.; Sills, David M. L.; Kopp, Gregory A.; Rhee, Daniel M.; Lombardo, Franklin T. (July 2023). "Assessment of wind speeds along the damage path of the Alonsa, Manitoba EF4 tornado on 3 August 2018". Journal of Wind Engineering and Industrial Aerodynamics. 238 105422. Bibcode:2023JWEIA.23805422S. doi:10.1016/j.jweia.2023.105422. S2CID 258127319.
- Wakimoto, R. M.; Murphey, H. V.; Dowell, D. C.; Bluestein, H. B. (2003). "The Kellerville Tornado during VORTEX: Damage Survey and Doppler Radar Analyses". Monthly Weather Review. 131 (10). American Meteorological Society: 2197–2221. Bibcode:2003MWRv..131.2197W. doi:10.1175/1520-0493(2003)131<2197:TKTDVD>2.0.CO;2.
- Wurman, Joshua; Alexander, Curtis R. (January 2005). "The 30 May 1998 Spencer, South Dakota, Storm. Part II: Comparison of Observed Damage and Radar-Derived Winds in the Tornadoes". Monthly Weather Review. 133 (1): 97–119. Bibcode:2005MWRv..133...97W. doi:10.1175/MWR-2856.1.
- —; Kosiba, Karen; White, Trevor; et al. (April 6, 2021). "Supercell tornadoes are much stronger and wider than damage-based ratings indicate". Proceedings of the National Academy of Sciences. 118 (14) e2021535118. Bibcode:2021PNAS..11821535W. doi:10.1073/pnas.2021535118. PMC 8040662. PMID 33753558.
- Yuko Murayama; Dimiter Velev; Plamena Zlateva, eds. (2019). Information Technology in Disaster Risk Reduction. Springer. ISBN 978-3-030-32169-7.
  - Benny Benyamin Nasution; Rahmat Widia Sembiring; Muhammad Syahruddin; Nursiah Mustari; Abdul Rahman Dalimunthe; Nisfan Bahri; Berta br Ginting; Zulkifli Lubis. "Real-Time Tornado Forecasting Using SLHGN". In Yuko Murayama, Dimiter Velev & Plamena Zlateva (2019), pp. 97–119.
