= Patricia (disambiguation) =

Patricia is a feminine given name.

Patricia may also refer to:

== Places ==
- Patricia, Alberta, Canada, a hamlet
- Patricia Lake (Alberta), in Jasper National Park
- Patricia Bay, British Columbia, Canada
- Patricia, South Dakota, United States, an unincorporated community
- Patricia, Texas, United States, an unincorporated community
- 436 Patricia, an asteroid

== Boats and ships ==
- USS Patricia (1899), a United States troop ship
- MV Patricia, a cargo ship
- Patricia (log canoe)
- THV Patricia, a vessel operated by Trinity House
- Baltavia, operated by Rederi Akab Svenska Lloyd in the 1920s as the Patricia

== Songs ==
- "Patricia" (1950 song), recorded by Perry Como
- "Patricia" (Perez Prado song)
- "Patricia", a song on High as Hope, a 2018 Florence and the Machine album
- "Patricia", a song written by Art Pepper dedicated to his daughter of the same name.

== People ==
- Matt Patricia (born 1974), American National Football League head coach
- Patricia (actress), Burmese actress and model born Win Thinzar Thaw in 1997

== Other uses ==
- List of storms named Patricia
- Patricia (butterfly), a genus of clearwing butterflies
- Patricia tree, a computer science data structure
- Patricia (film), a 1942 French comedy film

== See also ==
- SS Princess Patricia, a cruise ship launched in 1949
- The Lady Patricia, a cargo ship, later converted to a tanker, launched in 1962
- HMS Paxton, originally commissioned as HMAV Lady Patricia
