= Southern Minnesota tornadoes of June 15, 1892 =

Weather event in Minnesota, United States

Tornado outbreak
- Tornadoes: 3
- Max. rating: F5 tornado
- Duration: June 15, 1892

Overall effects
- Fatalities: 12
- Injuries: 76
- Damage: Unknown (Note: All losses are in 1892 United States dollars unless otherwise noted.)
- Areas affected: Southern Minnesota
- Part of the tornadoes and tornado outbreaks of 1892

On Wednesday, June 15, 1892, a violent, deadly tornado family swept portions of southern Minnesota, striking several communities, killing a dozen people, and injuring 76. It generated three intense tornadoes—retroactively rated F3 or stronger on the Fujita scale—including a powerful F5 that claimed nine lives (the other tornadoes collectively killed three or more others and caused F3 damage). According to tornado expert Thomas P. Grazulis, the twisters were part of a "complex" severe weather event.

== Confirmed tornadoes ==
Confirmed tornadoes by Fujita rating
FU	F0	F1	F2	F3	F4	F5	Total
0	?	?	0	2	0	1	3

Prior to 1990, there is a likely undercount of tornadoes, particularly E/F0–1, with reports of weaker tornadoes becoming more common as population increased. A sharp increase in the annual average E/F0–1 count by approximately 200 tornadoes was noted upon the implementation of NEXRAD Doppler weather radar in 1990–1991. (Note: Historically, the number of tornadoes globally and in the United States was and is likely underrepresented: research by Grazulis on annual tornado activity suggests that, as of 2001, only 53% of yearly U.S. tornadoes were officially recorded. Documentation of tornadoes outside the United States was historically less exhaustive, owing to the lack of monitors in many nations and, in some cases, to internal political controls on public information. Most countries only recorded tornadoes that produced severe damage or loss of life. Significant low biases in U.S. tornado counts likely occurred through the early 1990s, when advanced NEXRAD was first installed and the National Weather Service began comprehensively verifying tornado occurrences.) 1974 marked the first year where significant tornado (E/F2+) counts became homogenous with contemporary values, attributed to the consistent implementation of Fujita scale assessments. (Note: The Fujita scale was devised under the aegis of scientist T. Theodore Fujita in the early 1970s. Prior to the advent of the scale in 1971, tornadoes in the United States were officially unrated. Tornado ratings were retroactively applied to events prior to the formal adoption of the F-scale by the National Weather Service. While the Fujita scale has been superseded by the Enhanced Fujita scale in the U.S. since February 1, 2007, Canada used the old scale until April 1, 2013; nations elsewhere, like the United Kingdom, apply other classifications such as the TORRO scale.) Numerous discrepancies on the details of tornadoes in this outbreak exist between sources. The total count of tornadoes and ratings differs from various agencies accordingly. The list below documents information from the most contemporary official sources alongside assessments from tornado historian Thomas P. Grazulis.

=== June 15 event ===
List of confirmed tornadoes – Wednesday, June 15, 1892
F#	Location	County / Parish	State	Time (UTC) (Note: All dates are based on the local time zone where the tornado touched down; however, all times are in Coordinated Universal Time and dates are split at midnight CST/CDT for consistency.)	Path length	Width (Note: The listed width values are primarily the average/mean width of the tornadoes, with those having known maximum widths denoted by ♯. From 1952 to 1994, reports largely list mean width whereas contemporary years list maximum width. Values provided by Grazulis are the average width, with estimates being rounded down (i.e. 0.5 mi (0.80 km) is rounded down from 880 yards to 800 yards.)	Damage
F3	N of Alpha to NNE of Sherburn to NE of Northrop	Jackson, Martin	MN	21:25–?	25 mi (40 km)	150 yd (140 m)	Unknown
F3	2+ deaths – This was the first member of a long-lived tornado family in south-central Minnesota this day. It first wrecked a farmhouse, killing a few children inside, and then shattered a schoolhouse, tossing books 1 mi (1.6 km) away; at the school it injured a teacher and 16 pupils, some critically, possibly causing a fatality. It also destroyed a home near Welcome before dissipating. In all 23 injuries occurred.						
F5	W of Easton to S of Minnesota Lake to W of Blooming Prairie	Faribault, Freeborn, Steele	MN	22:45–?	40 mi (64 km)	500 yd (460 m)	Unknown
F5	9 deaths – An exceptionally violent tornado swept away several farmsteads, throwing large timbers from homes up to 3 mi (4.8 km) away and spearing them into the ground. According to Grazulis, it "obliterated" entire homesites at F5 intensity, killing seven people in the Minnesota Lake–Easton area. It then killed a few more people and caused F4 damage in the Hartland–Wells area. 45 injuries occurred.						
F3	ENE of Blue Earth to S of Wells	Faribault	MN	23:00–?	15 mi (24 km)	Unknown	Unknown
F3	1+ death – Closely paralleling the Easton F5, this tornado may have killed multiple people, but details are scarce. Eight injuries occurred.						

== See also ==
- Climate of Minnesota
- List of North American tornadoes and tornado outbreaks

== Sources ==
- Agee, Ernest M.; Childs, Samuel (June 1, 2014). "Adjustments in Tornado Counts, F-Scale Intensity, and Path Width for Assessing Significant Tornado Destruction". Journal of Applied Meteorology and Climatology. 53 (6). American Meteorological Society: 1494–1505. Bibcode:2014JApMC..53.1494A. doi:10.1175/JAMC-D-13-0235.1.
- Brooks, Harold E. (April 2004). "On the Relationship of Tornado Path Length and Width to Intensity". Weather and Forecasting. 19 (2): 310–19. Bibcode:2004WtFor..19..310B. doi:10.1175/1520-0434(2004)019<0310:OTROTP>2.0.CO;2.
- Cook, A. R.; Schaefer, J. T. (August 2008). "The Relation of El Niño–Southern Oscillation (ENSO) to Winter Tornado Outbreaks". Monthly Weather Review. 136 (8): 3121–3137. Bibcode:2008MWRv..136.3121C. doi:10.1175/2007MWR2171.1.
- Edwards, Roger; LaDue, James G.; Ferree, John T.; Scharfenberg, Kevin; Maier, Chris; Coulbourne, William L. (May 1, 2013). "Tornado Intensity Estimation: Past, Present, and Future". Bulletin of the American Meteorological Society. 94 (5). American Meteorological Society: 641–653. Bibcode:2013BAMS...94..641E. doi:10.1175/BAMS-D-11-00006.1.
- Grazulis, Thomas P. (May 1984). Violent Tornado Climatography, 1880–1982. OSTI (Technical report). NUREG. Washington, D.C.: Nuclear Regulatory Commission. OSTI 7099491. CR-3670.
  - — (November 1990). Significant Tornadoes 1880–1989. Vol. 2. St. Johnsbury, Vermont: The Tornado Project of Environmental Films. ISBN 1-879362-02-3.
  - — (July 1993). Significant Tornadoes 1680–1991: A Chronology and Analysis of Events. St. Johnsbury, Vermont: The Tornado Project of Environmental Films. ISBN 1-879362-03-1.
  - — (2001a). The Tornado: Nature's Ultimate Windstorm. Norman: University of Oklahoma Press. ISBN 978-0-8061-3538-0.
  - — (2001b). F5-F6 Tornadoes. St. Johnsbury, Vermont: The Tornado Project of Environmental Films.
- Seely, Mark W. (2006). Minnesota Weather Almanac (1st ed.). Minnesota Historical Society Press. ISBN 0-87351-554-4.
