= Greg Kopp =

Gregory A. Kopp is a Canadian academic and engineer, currently serving as the ImpactWX Chair in Severe Storms Engineering and the Director of the Canadian Severe Storms Laboratory at University of Western Ontario (UWO).

== Life and career ==
Kopp received his BSc in mechanical engineering from the University of Manitoba in 1989, an MEng from McMaster University in 1991, and a PhD in mechanical engineering from the University of Toronto in 1995. He received the position of assistant professor at the UWO in 1997, and became a full professor in the Department of Civil and Environmental Engineering in 2007.

== Research ==
Kopp's research focuses on mitigating disaster and increasing resilience during extreme wind, during natural disasters like tornadoes and hurricanes. His research has been implemented in building codes globally, with the primary goal of keeping the roofs attached to houses in the case of extreme weather. Kopp was the lead researcher at the Insurance Research Lab for Better Homes, where the team would build structures and subject them to extreme wind to test the strength of various building practices. In 2017, he established the Northern Tornadoes Project at the UWO with David Sills and the financial support of social impact fund ImpactWX, and together they launched the Canadian Severe Storms Laboratory at the UWO in 2024 with Kopp as director.
