= The Lady Patricia =

Former freight ship

The Lady Patricia was a vessel in the Guinness shipping fleet.

== History ==
The Lady Patricia was built by Charles Hill & Sons of Bristol as a replacement for The Guinness. She was launched in November 1962 by Lady Patrica Lennox-Boyd Guinness, wife of former British Cabinet Minister Alan Tindal Lennox-Boyd, daughter of Rupert Guinness, 2nd Earl of Iveagh and Gwendolen Guinness, Countess of Iveagh.

In 1973 she was converted into a tanker.

In April 1993 she sailed out of Dublin port for the last time, to the Manchester Ship Canal, where she was sold. In April 1993 she was scrapped.

== Filming ==
In Far and Away she was used as the emigrant ship and in Hear My Song she was used as the mailboat.
