= Northern Tornadoes Project =

Research initiative at the University of Western Ontario

The Northern Tornadoes Project is a research initiative at the University of Western Ontario that focuses on tornadoes and other severe convective storm-related wind phenomena in Canada. It was founded in 2017 by Greg Kopp and David Sills, with the financial support of Toronto-based social impact fund ImpactWX.

== Background ==
The Northern Tornadoes Project (NTP) was launched in 2017 to improve the detection, assessment and documentation of tornadoes in Canada, particularly for the vast, non-urban regions of the country with low population density, and ultimately determine the true tornado climatology of the country. While piloted aircraft were used initially to identify areas of wind-related damage in forested areas of Ontario and Quebec, high-resolution satellite imagery (nominal resolution 3 m) available on a near-daily basis became a key dataset, allowing the documentation of many tornadoes in Canada's northern forested areas that would otherwise not be identified.

An early success was documenting Quebec's largest tornado outbreak on record in 2017 (17 on June 18). However, this record was tied the very next year (17 on September 5). These were among the largest tornado outbreaks ever recorded in Canada.

The NTP's scope was increased in 2019 to include all tornadoes and other thunderstorm-related damaging wind events (e.g., downbursts) across Canada, with Sills becoming director and Kopp serving as the ImpactWX Chair in Severe Storm Engineering.

Kopp and Sills went on to co-found the Canadian Severe Storms Laboratory (CSSL), a partnership between the University of Western Ontario and ImpactWx, in 2024. The work of the NTP, and other projects, continues under the umbrella of the CSSL.

== NTP operations and research ==
The NTP team under Sills detects, assesses and documents all Canadian tornadoes, makes tornado data publicly available via an open data portal and dashboards that can be used to map event data. It also conducts research using the collected data, including climatology and trend analysis, techniques to improve tornado detection and wind speed estimation, and tornado warning verification.

== NTP-related scientific publications ==
Peer-reviewed journal articles

- Sills, D. M. L., G. A. Kopp, L. Elliott, A. Jaffe, E. Sutherland, C. Miller, J. Kunkel, E. Hong, S. Stevenson, and W. Wang, 2020: The Northern Tornadoes Project - uncovering Canada's true tornado climatology. Bull. Amer. Meteorol. Soc., 101, E2113–E2132, DOI 10.1175/BAMS-D-20-0012.1.
- Sills, D. M. L., C. S. Durfy, and C. P. E. de Souza, 2022: Are Significant Tornadoes Occurring Later in the Year in Southern Ontario? Geophysical Research Letters, 49, e2021GL096483, DOI 10.1029/2021GL096483.
- Kunkel, J., J. Hanesiak, and D. Sills, 2022: The hunt for missing tornadoes: Using satellite imagery to detect and document historical tornado damage in Canadian forests. J. Applied Meteorology & Climatology, 62, 139–154, DOI 10.1175/JAMC-D-22-0070.1.
- Ibrahim, I., G. A. Kopp, and D. M. L. Sills, 2023: Retrieval of peak thunderstorm wind velocities using WSR-88D weather radars. J. Atmos. Oceanic Technol., 40, 237–251, DOI 10.1175/JTECH-D-22-0028.1.
- Ngui, Y. D., M. R. Najafi, C. P. E. de Souza, and D. M. L. Sills, 2023: Probabilistic assessment of concurrent tornado and storm-related flash flood (TORFF) events. Int. J. Climatol., 43, 4231-4247, DOI 10.1002/joc.8084.
- Stevenson, S. A., C. S. Miller, D. M. L. Sills, G. A. Kopp, D. M. Rhee, and F. T. Lombardo, 2023: Assessment of wind speeds along the damage path of the Alonsa, Manitoba EF4 tornado on 3 August 2018. J. Wind Engineering & Industrial Aerodynamics, 238, 105422, DOI 10.1016/j.jweia.2023.105422.
- Sills, D. M. L and L. Elliott, 2023: Assessment of Tornado Alerting Performance for Canada. Atmos.-Ocean, DOI 10.1080/07055900.2023.2257163.
- Butt, D. G., A. L. Jaffe, C. S. Miller, G. A. Kopp and D. M. L. Sills, 2024: Automated large-scale tornado treefall detection and directional analysis using machine learning. Artificial Intelligence for the Earth Systems, DOI 10.1175/AIES-D-23-0062.1.
- Miller, C. S., G. A. Kopp, D. M. L. Sills and D. G. Butt, 2024: Estimating Wind Speeds in Tornadoes Using Debris Trajectories of Large Compact Objects. Mon. Wea. Rev., 152, 1859–1881, DOI 10.1175/MWR-D-23-0251.1.
- Butt, D. G., T. A. Newson, C. S. Miller, D. M. L. Sills and G. A. Kopp, 2025: Analysis of forest-based tornadoes using treefall patterns. Mon. Wea. Rev., DOI https://doi.org/10.1175/MWR-D-24-0249.1.
- Sills, D. M. L., and C. S. Miller, 2025: Multi-level in-situ measurements during a direct hit by a significant tornado. Atmosphere-Ocean, DOI 10.1080/07055900.2025.2554837.

Other Scientific Articles

- Sills, D., G. A. Kopp, E. Hong, J. Kennell, A. Jaffe, and L. Elliott, 2018: The Northern Tornadoes Project – overview and initial results. Extended Abstracts, 29th AMS Conference on Severe Local Storms, Stowe, VT, Amer. Meteorol. Soc., Paper 60, 1-6.
- Sills, D., E. Hong, A. Jaffe, S. Stevenson, and G. A. Kopp, 2018: The ‘cross-border’ tornado outbreak of 24 August 2016 – analysis of the two tornadoes in Ontario. Extended Abstracts, 29th AMS Conference on Severe Local Storms, Stowe, VT, Amer. Meteorol. Soc., Paper 180, 1-13.
- Kopp, G., D. Sills and J. Brimelow, 2024: Canada is witnessing more thunderstorm impacts than ever before. The Conversation - Canada Edition. Academic Journalism Society, Toronto, Canada. DOI 10.64628/AAM.756uj4pn6
- Sills, D., and G. Kopp, 2025: It’s challenging to predict extreme thunderstorms — improving this will help reduce their deadly and costly impacts. The Conversation, Academic Journalism Society, DOI 10.64628/AAM.vhrrcxrv6
- Sills, D., L. Elliott, D. Michelson and N. Donaldson, 2025: 'Missed' EF2 tornadoes in Canada and the role of radar. Extended Abstracts, 41st AMS Conference on Radar Meteorology, Toronto, ON, Amer. Meteorol. Soc., Paper 6B.4, 10 pp.

== NTP in the media ==
The work of the NTP has been featured on TV and radio, newspapers, magazines, and podcasts in Canada and the United States.
