= Patricia, South Dakota =

Unincorporated community in South Dakota, U.S.

Coordinates: 43°17′14″N 101°30′44″W

Patricia is an unincorporated community in Bennett County, in the U.S. state of South Dakota.

== History ==
Patricia was laid out in 1927, and named in honor of Patricia Tutsch, the wife of a first settler. A post office called Patricia was established in 1927, and remained in operation until 1955.
