= Main development region =

Tropical cyclone prone region in the Atlantic Ocean

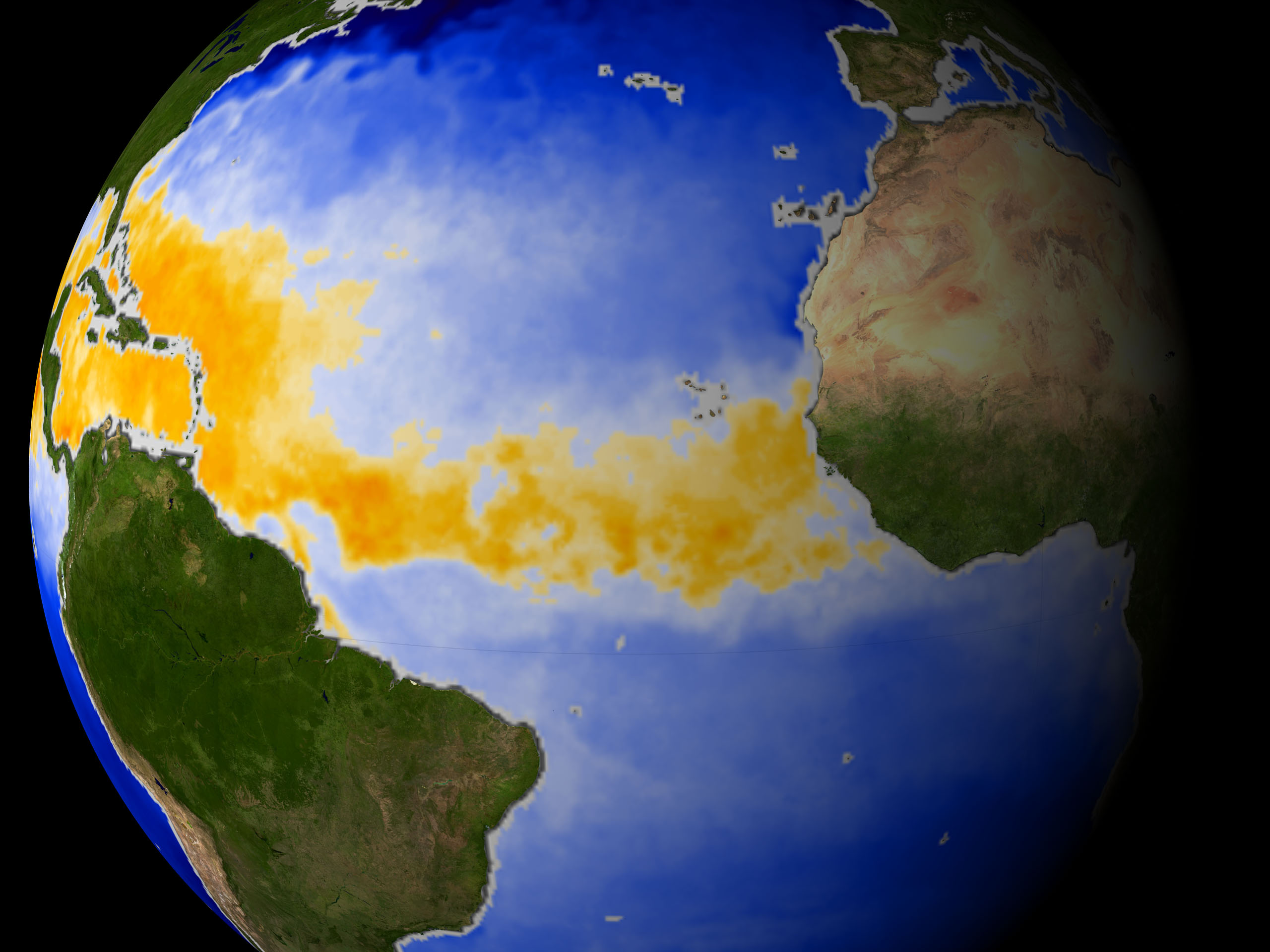
The warm waters of the main development region are depicted in orange.

The main development region (MDR) is the area of warm water in the Atlantic Ocean stretching from the west coast of northern Africa to the east coast of Central America and the Gulf Coast of the United States. Many tropical cyclones form within this area.

== Role in tropical cyclonegenesis ==
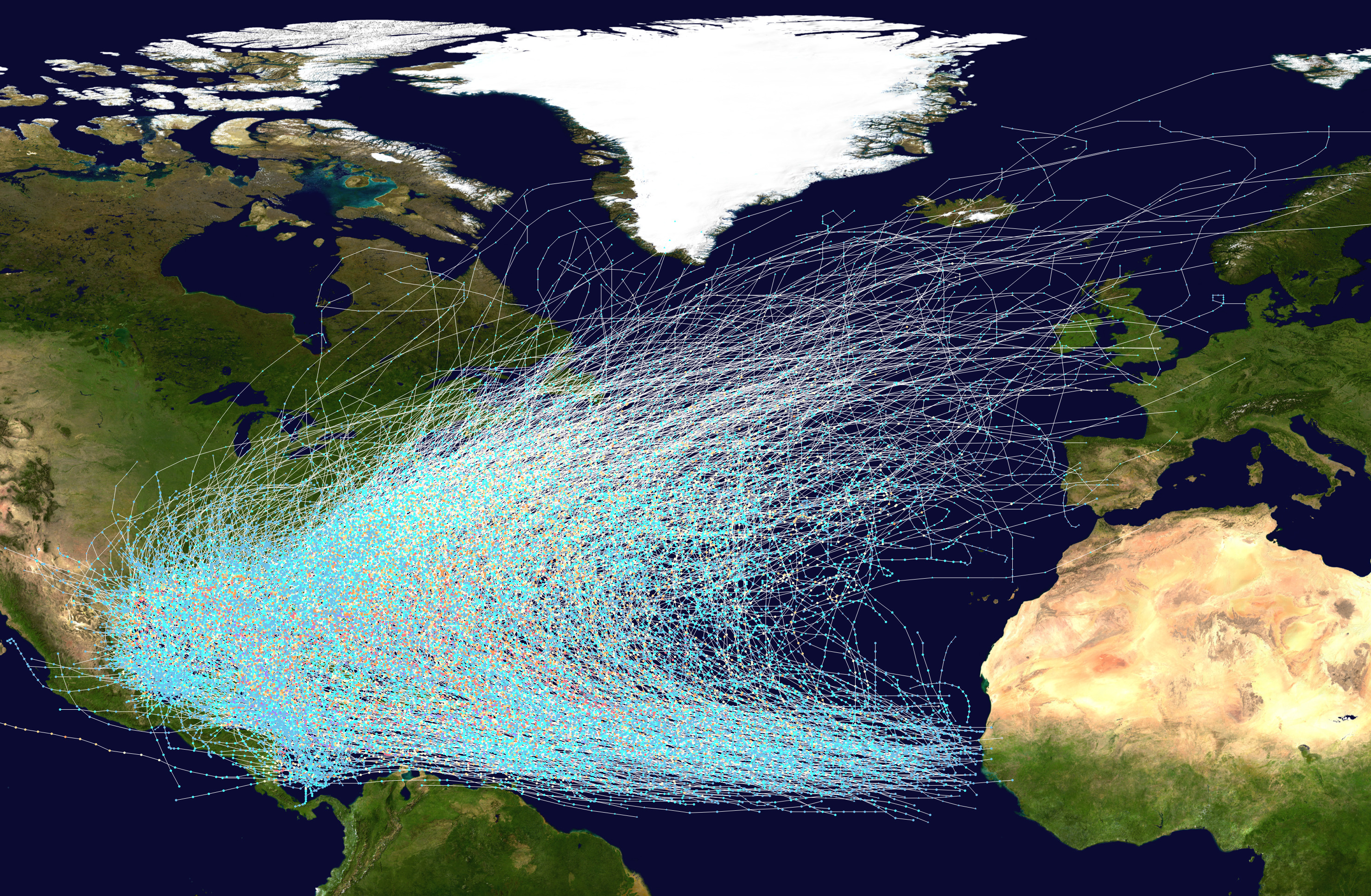
Atlantic hurricane tracks from 1851 to 2019

Tropical cyclone formation requires several factors, including: high humidity, low wind shear, and sufficiently warm sea surface temperatures. Regions of Earth's oceans with the required conditions are generally found between the latitudes of 8° and 20° from the equator. An ocean temperature of at least 26.5 °C (79.7 °F) is normally considered the minimum to maintain a tropical cyclone (though tropical systems situated underneath cold-core lows may develop and strengthen in cooler waters, as the colder air associated with the cold-core low increase environmental lapse rates and therefore instability). If water temperatures are lower, a system will most likely weaken. Conversely, higher water temperatures can enable a system to undergo rapid intensification.

In the Atlantic, the area between 10°N and 20°N spawns the most hurricanes in a given season because of the warmer temperatures. Hurricanes do not form outside this range because nearer to the equator the Coriolis effect is not strong enough to create the tight circulation needed, and farther north the temperatures are too cool. The waters are normally only at the necessary temperatures from July until mid-October. In the Atlantic this is the height of the season.

Since hurricanes rely on sea surface temperature, sometimes an initially active season becomes quiet later due to intense hurricanes upwelling cooler waters to the surface, resulting in an area of sea roughly the size of the system's windfield, and depending on the area's oceanic heat content, can be 5–10 °C (9.0–18.0 °F) lower than prior to the system's passage. When a new hurricane moves over the cooler waters they cannot sustain deep convection, resulting in weakening and dissipation.

== Historical trends ==
According to an Azores High hypothesis of geographer Kam-biu Liu, an anti-phase pattern is expected to exist between the Gulf of Mexico coast and the North American Atlantic coast. During the quiescent periods (3000–1400 BC, and 1000 AD to present), a more northeasterly position of the Azores High would result in more hurricanes being steered towards the Atlantic coast. During the hyperactive period (1400 BC to 1000 AD), more hurricanes were steered towards the Gulf coast as the Azores High was shifted to a more southwesterly position near the Caribbean. Such a displacement of the Azores High is consistent with paleoclimatic evidence that shows an abrupt onset of a drier climate in Haiti around 3200 years ago, and a change towards more humid conditions in the Great Plains during the late-Holocene as more moisture was pumped up the Mississippi Valley through the Gulf coast. Preliminary data from the northern Atlantic coast seem to support the Azores High hypothesis. A 3,000-year proxy record from a coastal lake in Cape Cod suggests that hurricane activity has increased significantly during the past 500–1,000 years, just as the Gulf coast was amid a quiescent period of the last millennium.

== See also ==
- Bermuda Triangle
- Hailstorm Alley
- Typhoon Alley
- Tornado Alley
