= Thomas P. Grazulis =

American meteorologist (born 1942)

- Born: August 17, 1942 (age 84); Worcester, Massachusetts, United States
- Education: Florida State University
- Known for: Tornado history, statistical, and climatology research
- Scientific career
- Fields: Meteorology
- Workplaces: The Tornado Project

Thomas P. Grazulis (born August 17, 1942) is an American meteorologist who has written extensively about tornadoes and produced documentaries as head of The Tornado Project.

== Biography ==
=== Early career ===
Thomas Grazulis grew up in Worcester, Massachusetts and first confronted the power of a tornado at age 11 following the violent 1953 Worcester tornado, an F4 which killed 94 people and passed approximately 1 mi (1.6 km) north of his childhood home.

Grazulis earned a bachelor's degree in meteorology from Florida State University (FSU) and was briefly a broadcaster, in part presenting the weather. He was a science teacher in New Jersey and worked on the "Earth Science Curriculum Project" with the National Science Foundation (NSF). He and his wife Doris, also a teacher and a small business operator, then moved to the St. Johnsbury, Vermont area in 1970. In 1972, they released Approaching the Unapproachable, a documentary film on tornadoes that was the first to consider tornadoes in a scientific context rather than as a hazard and was the first compilation of tornado footage.

=== Tornado database ===
In 1979, Grazulis began working with the Nuclear Regulatory Commission (NRC) to create a history of tornadoes. Specifically, he refined and augmented the databases of tornadoes maintained by the National Severe Storms Forecast Center (NSSFC) in Kansas City, Missouri, as well as the database headed by Ted Fujita at the University of Chicago, with whom he collaborated in developing their respective databases. The objective was to determine tornado occurrence and intensity distributions, i.e. tornado climatology, for risk assessment studies. Grazulis' tornado database work was considered important enough that he was awarded five years of additional funding from the National Science Foundation.

In the process, Grazulis traveled the country visiting dozens of libraries, museums, university archives, historical societies, and the like, to eventually chronicle 60,000 tornadoes, 50,000 of them included in a single 1,400-page book that is widely referenced. It is estimated he read 25,000 microfilm reels of (mostly major) newspapers. His work concentrated in state libraries and the U.S. Library of Congress and research libraries but also included local libraries when pertinent. The first book (which was two volumes), resulting from the NRC funded work, was Significant Tornadoes, 1880-1989. The book filled a gap in tornado information and strong sales led to an expansion, Significant Tornadoes, 1680-1991. In turn, proceeds of this book and of Tornado Project videos and posters were sufficiently robust to support an update that was published for the years 1992–1995. Significant Tornadoes contains 51 photographs of tornadoes prior to 1970, the most extensive collection published.

Grazulis amassed one of three authoritative tornado databases, those being the National Tornado Database assembled and maintained by NOAA agencies, the University of Chicago DAPPL database founded by Fujita which ended at his retirement in 1992, and the Grazulis Tornado Project database. As of 2023, the Grazulis database spans from 1680 to 2022 and includes all known significant tornadoes (those rated F2–F5 or causing a fatality). Grazulis' database was digitized and included in an international database combining many resources as they became more available in 2000-2020s, The Tornado Archive.

=== The Tornado Project ===
In the early 1990s, he and Doris formed The Tornado Project to market tornado videos, books, and posters. He collaborated with storm chaser Roy Britt to produce the popular Tornado Video Classics documentary series. In 1995, they adapted this collection for television to broadcast on The Learning Channel (TLC), and produced less advanced direct-to video documentaries catering to a wider audience, including Twister: Fury on the Plains and Twister: Nature's Fury. His book Significant Tornadoes is considered a critical and authoritative source among severe storms meteorologists.

In 1997, he became a storm chaser, noting that despite his fascination with storms he had never actually seen a tornado. He saw his first tornado, a very large one, near Tulsa, Oklahoma on Memorial Day of that year. By the late 1990s, Grazulis also constructed a variety of designs of physical simulator models of vortices. He used these for air flow experiments and for displays. Grazulis had long been interested in tornado simulators and included earlier laboratory studies in his TVC documentaries. The Secrets of the Tornado documentary featured a detailed instructional segment with an accompanying printed guide for constructing one's own.

The Tornado Project's website in 2018 indicated Significant Tornadoes would be updated and released in two volumes of approximately 705 pages each covering tornadoes from 1680 to 1949 and 1950 to 2019. The new volumes will include updates on statistics, graphs, and charts, as well as analysis of trends in tornadic activity and examination of potential influence thereof by climate change. In 2023, the first volume, Significant Tornadoes: 1974-2022, was published.

==== Outbreak Intensity Score ====
Within the book Significant Tornadoes 1974–2022 Grazulis created a new scale called the Outbreak Intensity Score (OIS) to rank tornado outbreaks. For the OIS, only significant tornadoes, those rated F2 to F5 on the Fujita scale and those rated EF2 to EF5 on the Enhanced Fujita scale are used for the score of the outbreak. F2/EF2 tornadoes are given 2 points, F3/EF3 tornadoes are given 5 points, F4/EF4 tornadoes are given 10 points, and F5/EF5 tornadoes are given 15 points.

The outbreak intensity score (OIS)
| Type of outbreak | Weak | Minor | Significant | Major | Devastating | Historic | Super |
|---|---|---|---|---|---|---|---|
| Number of points | 2–6 | 7–10 | 11–29 | 30–79 | 80–119 | 120–249 | 250+ |

== Affiliations ==
Grazulis is a Fellow of the American Meteorological Society (AMS) and was on the Fujita Scale Forum of the Fujita Scale Enhancement Project; which developed the Enhanced Fujita scale to supplant the original Fujita scale.

== Works ==
Grazulis initially produced documentaries on the Earth sciences before focusing on tornadoes and publishing books. He expanded to direct-to-video documentaries (which include extensive printed guides) and posters (with complementary background sheets) in the 1990s. Grazulis also wrote for Storm Track magazine, occasionally for Weatherwise magazine and others, and presents at meteorological and storm chaser conferences. The following is a list of his major works:

- The New Jersey Shoreline (1967 educational film)
- Approaching the Unapproachable (1972 documentary film)
- Tornado Video Classics I
- Tornado Video Classics II: The Magnificent Puzzle
- Tornado Video Classics III
- Secrets of the Tornado (documentary)
- (1984) Violent Tornado Climatology, 1880–1982. NUREG/CR-3670, U.S. Nuclear Regulatory Commission, Washington, DC
- (1990) Significant Tornadoes 1880–1989: A Chronology and Analysis of Events
- (1993) Significant Tornadoes 1680–1991: A Chronology and Analysis of Events
- (1996) Significant Tornadoes Update 1992–1995
- (2001) The Tornado: Nature's Ultimate Windstorm
- (2023) Significant Tornadoes 1974–2022

Grazulis in 2001 penned a book for a general readership, an homage and unofficial update to Snowden D. Flora's classic Tornadoes of the United States (1953), entitled The Tornado: Nature's Ultimate Windstorm. Both were published by the University of Oklahoma Press.
