= Timothy P. Marshall =

American structural and forensic engineer

Tim Marshall
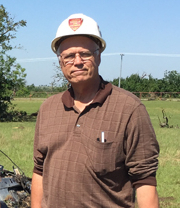
- Marshall in 2016
- Born: October 17, 1956 (age 69); Evergreen Park, Illinois, USA
- Education: Northern Illinois University (B.S., 1978); Texas Tech University (M.S., 1980, 1983)
- Known for: Tornado damage analysis, wind and hail engineering
- Scientific career
- Fields: Structural engineering and meteorology
- Workplaces: Haag Engineering
- Thesis: The Utilization of Load and Resistance Statistics in a Wind Speed Assessment (1983)

Timothy Patrick Marshall (born October 17, 1956) is an American structural and forensic engineer as well as a meteorologist, concentrating on damage analysis, particularly that from wind, hail, and other weather phenomena. He is also a pioneering storm chaser and was editor of Storm Track magazine.

== Early life and education ==
Marshall was born to Charles and Catherine Marshall in Evergreen Park near Chicago, in 1956 and raised in Oak Lawn, then in Oak Brook. Oak Lawn was heavily damaged during the historic 1967 Oak Lawn tornado outbreak of April 21, 1967, when he was 10 years old. The F4 "Oak Lawn tornado" touched down about 4 mi (6.4 km) west of his home and killed 33 in town, including some of his classmates. This experience served to strengthen his interest in meteorology, and he focused his studies on tornadoes.

Marshall attended Northern Illinois University (NIU) in DeKalb, attaining a B.S. degree in geography with a concentration in meteorology in 1978. As an undergraduate student there, he and classmates surveyed some tornado damage paths of the 1974 Super Outbreak during an informal trip to the National Climatic Data Center (NCDC) to collect severe weather data. Later, he and fellow students visited the National Severe Storms Forecast Center (NSSFC) and obtained a large collection of materials the library was dumping, which formed the basis of his own library.

Marshall went to Texas for graduate school, seeing his first tornado a few hours after entering the state. In 1978, he began storm chasing in west Texas and Oklahoma. He participated in field research and damage surveys. In 1980, he earned a M.S. degree majoring in atmospheric sciences from Texas Tech University in Lubbock with the thesis Topographic Influences on Amarillo Radar Echo Climatology, then went on to earn an M.S. degree in civil engineering from the same university. At Texas Tech, he worked part-time at the Institute for Disaster Research where he began surveying tornado and hurricane damage. His first official tornado damage survey was in Grand Island, Nebraska, in 1980 and his first hurricane damage survey was Hurricane Allen in south Texas later that year. His thesis was titled The Utilization of Load and Resistance Statistics in a Wind Speed Assessment.

== Career ==
In 1983, Marshall was hired by the leading Texas firm Haag Engineering and eventually became Senior Engineer and Meteorologist. At Haag, he travels a great deal surveying storm damage across the United States. He has conducted more than 100 damage surveys of hailstorms, tornadoes, and hurricanes. Some of the famous tornadoes he surveyed include the F5s at Jarrell, Texas (1997), Bridge Creek, Oklahoma (1999), Greensburg, Kansas (2007), Alabama (2011), Joplin, Missouri (2011), and Moore, Oklahoma (2013). Some of the famous hurricanes he has surveyed include Alicia in Texas (1983), Hugo in South Carolina (1989), Andrew in Florida (1992), Opal in Florida (1995), Katrina in Mississippi (2005), and Ike in Texas (2008). He became a Professional Engineer in 1989.

Marshall still finds time to pursue his hobby storm chasing. During the past 30 years, he filmed more than 200 tornadoes and experienced 17 hurricanes. In 2004, he rode out Hurricane Ivan in Pensacola, Florida and, in 2005, he rode out Hurricane Katrina in Slidell, Louisiana. In 2008, he rode out Hurricane Ike in Galveston, Texas.

Marshall appeared on dozens of television programs including those on The Discovery Channel, The Learning Channel, National Geographic Channel, The History Channel, and The Weather Channel. He was a guest on The Oprah Winfrey Show twice and appeared multiple times on NOVA. He has also been a radio guest, such as on NPR, and has been featured in magazines such as National Geographic and Weatherwise, to the latter of which he has contributed some articles. He also has published tornado related articles in the Bulletin of the American Meteorological Society and Weather and Forecasting.

Marshall was selected by the National Oceanic and Atmospheric Administration (NOAA) to serve on their Quick Response Team (QRT) where he has surveyed tornado damage in Alabama and Georgia in 1994, Nashville, Tennessee in 1998, La Plata, Maryland in 2002, Parkersburg, Iowa in 2008, the 2011 Super Outbreak, the 2011 Joplin tornado, and the 2015 Dallas-Ft. Worth Metroplex tornadoes. He was on the development team of the Fujita Scale Enhancement Project which produced an Enhanced Fujita Scale to update the original Fujita scale of tornado intensity. He was also a major contributor to the committee to update the Saffir–Simpson scale. He has been a principal trainer in damage surveys for the National Weather Service (NWS) since the 1990s. Between 2006 and 2012, he was elected to serve on the Severe Local Storms committee for the American Meteorological Society. In 2009 and 2010, he was part of the government sponsored VORTEX2 experiment working on the Center of Severe Weather Research (CSWR) team with Joshua Wurman. In 2012 he continued working with CSWR on the ROTATE (Radar Observations of Tornadoes and Thunderstorms Project). His job was to deploy in-situ pods in the paths of tornadoes and perform mobile mesonet transects of storm environments.

== Personal life ==
During his early years in Texas, Marshall was married to Kay, who he met at a concert. She is a natural history museum exhibit designer and an ornithologist. She sometimes accompanies him on storm chases. He learned and taught guitar as a youth and enjoys mountain climbing, snorkeling, and scuba diving.

== Publications ==
Marshall has authored and coauthored numerous scientific publications in the realms of meteorology and civil engineering. In addition to editing and writing for Storm Track (1986–2002) and writing various articles for Weatherwise, he wrote the following booklets:

- Storm Chase Manual (1979. 1983, 1986, 1998)
- Storm Talk (1995)
- Tornado Talk (1998)
- Tornado Forecasters Workbook (1998)

Marshall also released the following DVDs through Storm Track: 1991 Kansas Tornadoes, 1995 Wedgefest, 1998 Octoberfest, 1999 Oklahoma Tornado Outbreak, 2000 Millennium Chases, 2002 Chase Highlights, 2003 Chase Highlights, 2004 Midwest Mayhem, 2005 Spin Summer, 2007 Tornado Chases, 2008 Tornado and Hurricane Chases, 2009 Inside VORTEX 2, 2010 Tornado Chases, and Tim Marshall's 25 Years of Tornado Chasing.

== See also ==
- Failure analysis
- Hurricane engineering
- Tornado intensity and damage
- David K. Hoadley
