= Dixie Alley =

Nickname for areas of the southern United States which has strong or violent tornadoes

"Dixie Alley" is a colloquial term sometimes used for areas of the southern United States which are particularly vulnerable to strong to violent tornadoes. Some argue this is distinct from the better known Tornado Alley and that it has a high frequency of strong, long-track tornadoes that move at higher speeds. The term was coined by National Severe Storms Forecast Center (NSSFC) Director Allen Pearson after witnessing a tornado outbreak which included more than nine long-track, violent tornadoes that killed 121 on February 21–22, 1971.

== Geography ==
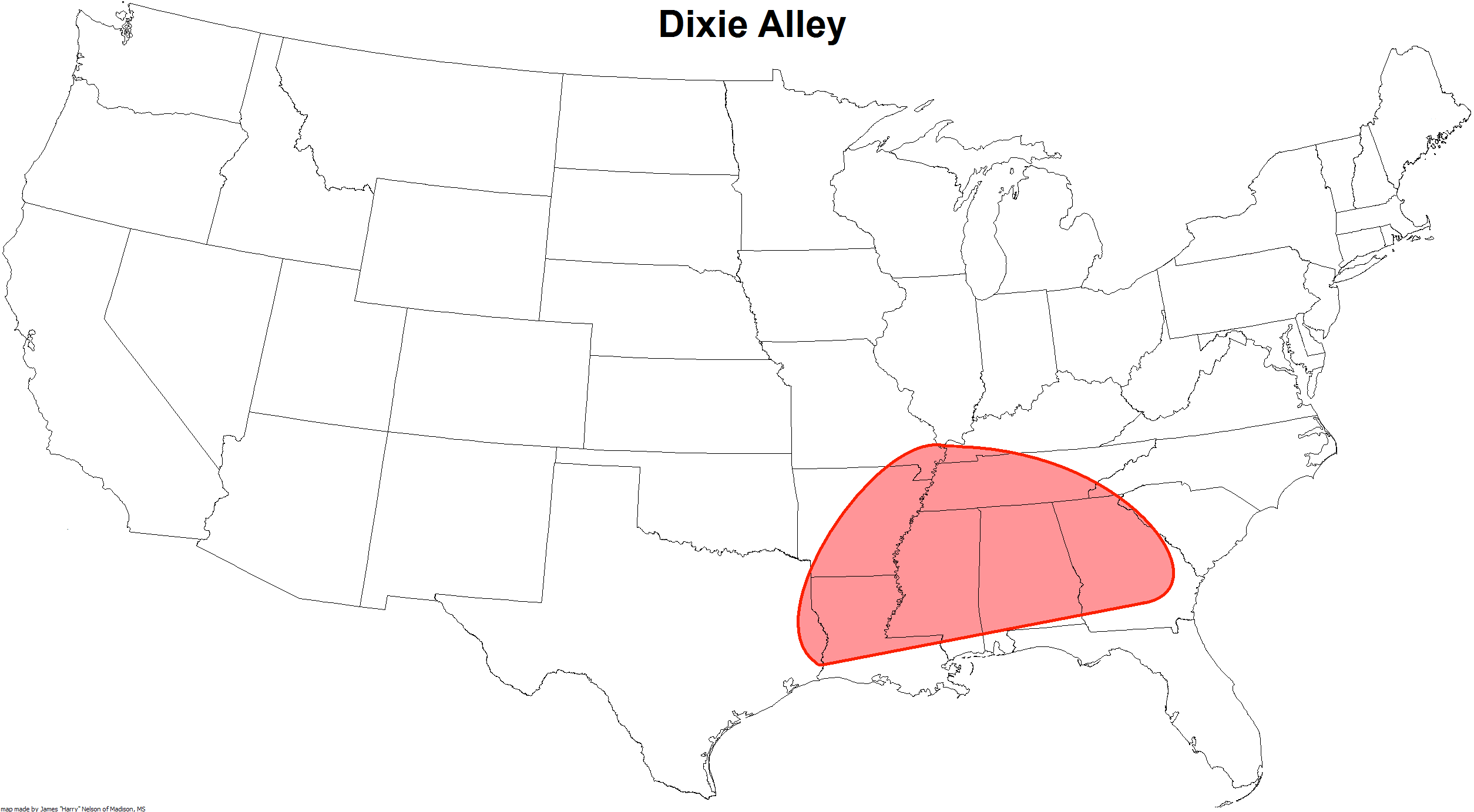
The Dixie Alley region indicated by red shaded area.

Dixie Alley includes much of the area of the lower Mississippi Valley. It stretches from eastern Texas and Arkansas across Louisiana, Mississippi, Tennessee, Alabama, Georgia, and mid to western Kentucky to upstate South Carolina and western North Carolina; the area reaches as far north as southeast Missouri. Another source places all of Arkansas within Dixie Alley.

== Tornado risk ==
Although tornadoes are less frequent in these states than they are in the southern Plains, the southeastern states have had more tornado-related deaths than any of the Plains states (excluding Texas). This is partly due to the relatively high numbers of strong (F2/EF2 or F3/EF3) to violent (F4/EF4 or F5/EF5) long tracked tornadoes. Between 1950 and 2006, Alabama was tied with Kansas for the largest number of F5 tornadoes. Aside from intensity, tornadoes in this region are often difficult to see, as they are more likely to be rain-wrapped, embedded in shafts of heavy rain, and are often obscured from view by the hilly topography and heavily forested landscape. Because significant tornadoes in Dixie Alley tend to occur earlier in the year than in other regions, when there are fewer daylight hours, they are more likely to occur at night. Faster wind currents during these cooler months also result in faster-moving tornadoes. Both of these factors leave people more likely to be caught off-guard. Higher tornadic fatality rates are also partly due to the higher population density of this region. The Southern United States also has the highest percentage of manufactured homes in the US. The risk of death in such homes from tornadoes is 15-20 times higher than in permanent homes because they are more easily destroyed. Permanent homes in the Southeast also tend to have weaker frames than in other tornado-forming regions.

== Prevalent tornado characteristics ==
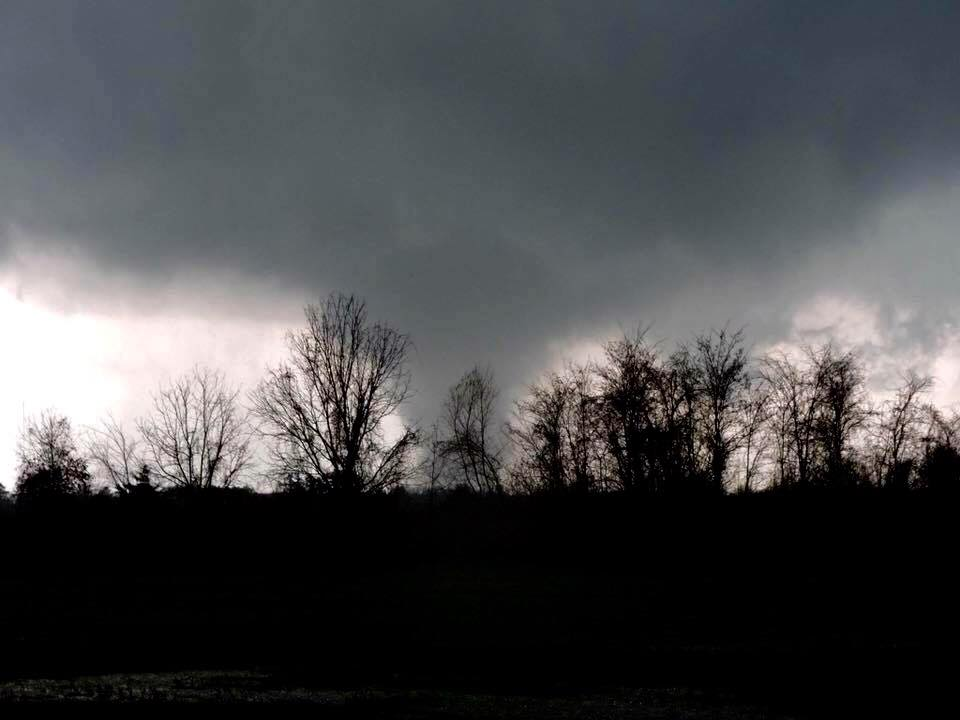
Tornado in Mississippi, located in Dixie Alley, obscured by trees and featuring a notably low, rugged base.

Dixie Alley is part of a region of enhanced tornadic activity extending between the Appalachian and Rocky Mountains, but tornadoes and outbreaks in the Dixie Alley region exhibit some statistically distinguishable characteristics from the more well known Tornado Alley. Tornadic storms in Dixie Alley are most often high precipitation supercells due to an increase of moisture from proximity to the nearby Gulf of Mexico. The Dixie Alley tornadoes accompanying the HP supercells are often partially or fully wrapped in rain, impairing the visibility of the tornadoes to storm spotters and chasers, law enforcement, and the public. Increases of warmth and instability in conjunction with strong wind shear in the Dixie Alley region impacts the times when tornadoes form. In the traditional Tornado Alley, tornadoes most often form from the mid afternoon to early evening. Dixie Alley's instability can be maintained long after sunset due to being adjacent to the Gulf, increasing the frequency of intense nighttime and early morning tornadoes. There is also a less focused tornado season which tends to be most active in early spring and late autumn but can continue throughout the winter and into late spring, which can lead to complacency among residents of the region. The region often is subject to tornadoes much earlier than the general national peak from May and June, usually from February to Mid-April, and several notorious outbreaks have struck during the late winter and early spring and also in late fall. The complacency situation was noted after the 2008 Super Tuesday tornado outbreak in February 2008 that hit the Dixie Alley killing 57 people, many people indicated that they had underestimated the threat of severe weather on that day since it was well before the peak of tornado season.

A 2018 study found in the U.S. an overall eastward shift of tornado frequency and impacts – toward Dixie Alley. The study found relatively-lower tornado frequency and impacts in parts of the traditional Tornado Alley, especially areas from north-central Texas toward the Houston, Texas area, and relatively-higher tornado frequency and impacts in parts of the Mid-South, especially eastern Arkansas, the greater Memphis, Tennessee area, Western Kentucky, and northern Mississippi – all areas near the heart of Dixie Alley (see especially Figure 4).

Variations in climate patterns and teleconnections, such as the El Niño–Southern Oscillation (ENSO) can also have significant impacts on tornadic activity in the region from year to year. Climate change is also expected to affect tornado activity in the region.

== Notable outbreaks ==
Dixie Alley has been subject to numerous tornado outbreaks throughout history, including very intense outbreaks and those of very large spatial and temporal extent. Notorious outbreaks affecting the region include: the Great Natchez Tornado, the 1884 Enigma tornado outbreak, the April 1924 tornado outbreak, the 1932 Deep South tornado outbreak, the 1936 Tupelo–Gainesville tornado outbreak, the April 1957 Southeastern tornado outbreak, the 1984 Carolinas tornado outbreak, and the November 1992 tornado outbreak. The 1974 Super Outbreak also hit the area very hard, producing multiple F5 tornadoes in Alabama, and F4 tornadoes in North Georgia and the Appalachian southwest of North Carolina. More recently the region was hit by the 2008 Super Tuesday tornado outbreak followed by the tornado outbreak of April 14–16, 2011, the deadliest since the 2008 outbreak. Two weeks after the April 14–16 event, Dixie Alley was the epicenter of the 2011 Super Outbreak, which was the largest tornado outbreak ever recorded, as well as the fourth-deadliest outbreak in United States history, with over 300 people dead. The Easter 2020 Tornado Outbreak also happened in Dixie Alley. It spawned over 100 tornadoes and has a spot in the top most tornadoes in 24 hours in an outbreak.

== Research ==
The specific characteristics of the Southeast led to VORTEX-SE, a field project studying tornadogenesis, diagnosis and forecasting, in addition to social science implications, and examines both supercellular tornadoes and those resulting from quasi-linear convective system (QLCS) thunderstorm structures. This was followed a few years later by another major field project, PERiLS, focusing on QLCS tornadoes.

== See also ==
- List of tornadoes and tornado outbreaks
- Tornado climatology
- Hailstorm Alley
