= Storm Track =

American periodical magazine, 1977–2002

- Sample of the May–June 1999 cover
- Editor: Timothy P. Marshall
- Former editors: David K. Hoadley
- Categories: Science, hobby
- Frequency: Bimonthly
- Publisher: Tim Marshall (1986-2002); David Hoadley (1977-1986)
- Founder: David Hoadley
- Founded: 1977
- Final issue Number: 2002; Vol 25 No 1
- Country: United States
- Language: English
- Website: stormtrack.org
- OCLC: 9331024

Storm Track was the first magazine for and about storm chasing. The magazine was in circulation between 1977 and 2002.

== History and profile ==
Storm Track was started in 1977 by chasing pioneer David Hoadley following an informal meeting of storm chasers at an American Meteorological Society conference. In the beginning, it was published in newsletter format in Falls Church, Virginia, but in time assumed a magazine format and was published bimonthly throughout its history. In 1986, editorship was handed over to Tim Marshall, a storm damage engineer (and meteorologist). Production of paper issues ceased in 2002 after a 25-year run; however, an accompanying website started in 1996 and continues primarily in the form of a large discussion board.

Storm Track, among other topics, published storm chase accounts, discussions of issues affecting storm chasing, history of storm chasing and meteorology, meteorological analysis and case studies, climatology, reviews, biographies, photography, cartoons, poetry, and classifieds.

Storm Track was a non-profit publication aimed at scientists and amateurs interested in severe storms. Rich Herzog was an associate editor since 1991 and Phil Sherman an assistant editor from 1986–1990. Another associate editor and a founding member was Randy Zipser. Gene Rhoden contributed significantly to the cover design in 1986. It was published with Master Graphics in Dallas, Texas. Tim Vasquez was online editor. Most articles and photographs were submitted by subscribers. More than 180 people wrote articles for the magazine. David Hoadley made all the drawings and sketches and did many of the cartoons which were known as "Funnel Funnies". It began with 10 subscribers in 1977 and grew to several hundred over the years. Circulation peaked at nearly 1,000 in mid-1996 in association with the release of Twister.

In 2015, ownership of the Storm Track Brand was transferred to Steve Miller. Since the 2015 change in ownership, the discussion board has been updated to the newest edition of Xenforo. Additionally, a Storm Track mobile app was released (which has since been removed, with the newest update of Xenforo rendering it obsolete), along with the launch of a Discord server In July 2019, Storm Track launched Stormtrack TV, a 24-hour online television channel, in partnership with Helicity.

As of April 2018, the support functions of the Spotter Network forums have been housed at the Storm Track forums.

== See also ==
- Weatherwise magazine
- Tornado
- Supercell
- Hurricane
