= David M. Ludlum =

American meteorologist (1910–1997)

David McWilliams Ludlum
- Born: December 3, 1910; East Orange, New Jersey, USA
- Died: May 23, 1997 (aged 86); Princeton, New Jersey, USA
- Education: Princeton University, University of California, Berkeley
- Known for: History of American weather Weatherwise magazine
- Scientific career
- Fields: American history, meteorology
- Workplaces: United States Army, Systems Associates

David McWilliams Ludlum (December 3, 1910 – May 23, 1997) was an American historian, meteorologist, entrepreneur, and author. He was the founder of the only magazine in the U.S. about weather, Weatherwise, founded in 1947.

Ludlum played himself in the 1950 documentary film Cassino to Korea, which portrayed Ludlum's experiences as a captain in the United States Army Air Forces during World War II, when he accurately predicted a crucial weather break during the 1944 Battle of Monte Cassino, leading to the strategic launch of the Allied attack.

== Selected works ==
Ludlum published dozens of books in his lifetime. Here are a few:

- Social Ferment in Vermont, 1791-1850 (1939)
- Early American Hurricanes, 1492-1870 (1963)
- Early American Winters vol I, 1604-1820 (1966)
- Early American Winters vol II, 1821-1870 (1968)
- Early American Tornadoes, 1586-1870 (1970)
- Weather Record Book (1971)
- American Weather Book (1982)
- The New Jersey Weather Book (1983)
- The Weather Factor (1984)
- The Vermont Weather Book (1985)
- National Audubon Society Field Guide to North American Weather (1991)

== See also ==
- Thomas P. Grazulis
- Snowden D. Flora
- José Carlos Millás
