= Roger Jensen =

American photographer (1933–2001)

- Born: September 5, 1933; Fargo, North Dakota, USA
- Died: April 26, 2001 (aged 67); Terrell, Texas, USA
- Known for: Storm photography

Roger Jensen (September 5, 1933 - April 26, 2001) was an American photographer and the first known person to actively photograph storms beginning in 1953.

== See also ==
- David K. Hoadley
- Neil Ward
