= Climate of Calgary =

Calgary has a monsoon-influenced humid continental climate (Koppen: Dwb, Trewartha: Dclo bordering Dcbo), with warm, wet summers and cold, dry, but highly variable winters. The city has an average temperature range from 16.9 °C (62.4 °F) in July to −7.6 °C (18.3 °F) in January. Average temperatures at Springbank Airport (slightly west of Calgary) range from 15.3 °C (59.5 °F) in July to −8.4 °C (16.9 °F) in January. The record high temperature is 36.7 °C (98.1 °F), recorded on August 10, 2018, and the record low temperature is −45.0 °C (−49.0 °F), held on February 4, 1893. However, in recent years, due to climate change, yearly low temperatures usually hover between −25 °C (−13 °F) and −36 °C (−33 °F).

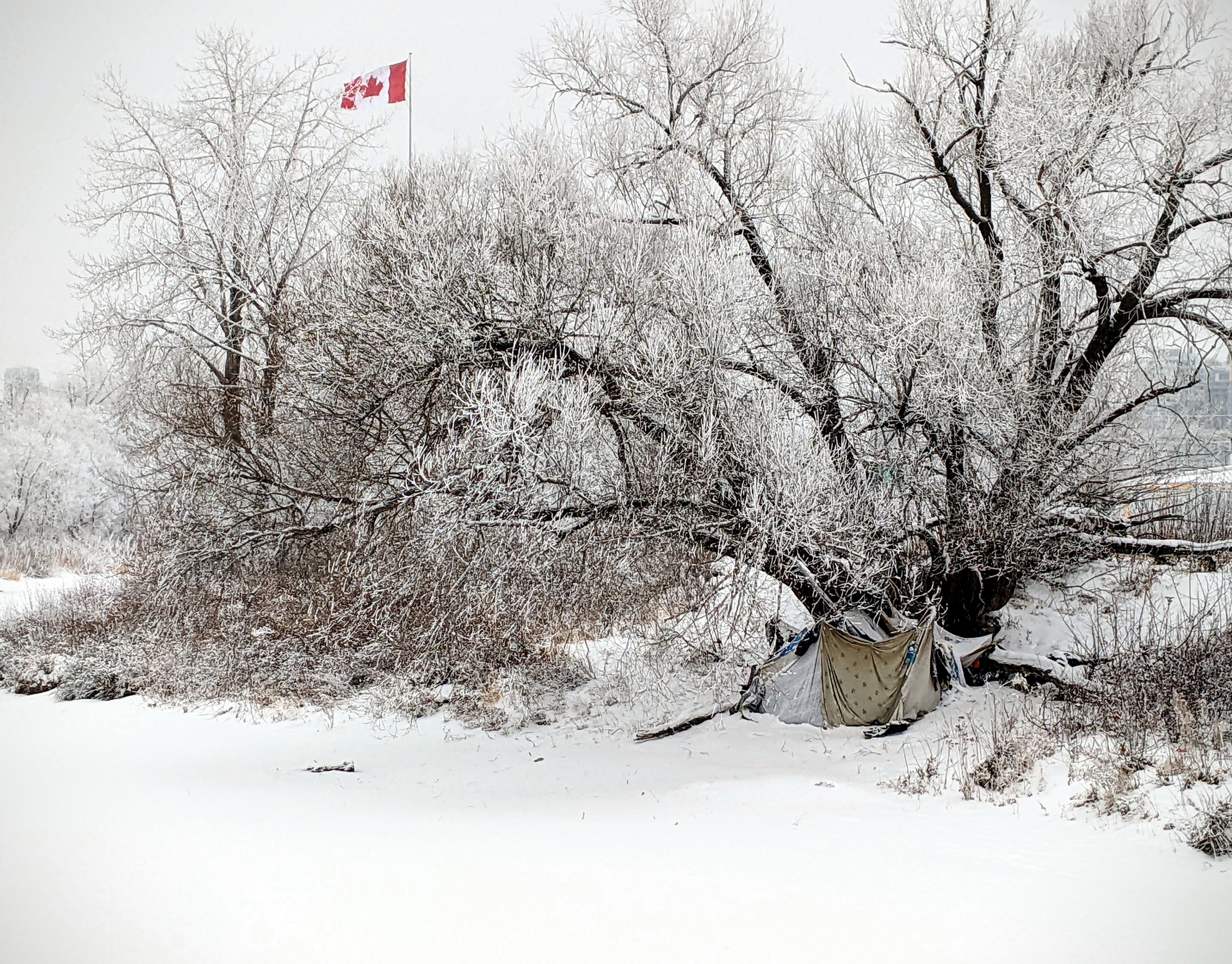
Calgary in winter.

Winters are cold, and the air temperature drops to or below −20 °C (−4 °F) for 22 days of the year on average, and as low as −30 °C (−22 °F) for 3.7 days of the year on average. These temperatures are frequently interrupted by warm, dry chinook winds that blow into Alberta over the mountains. These winds can raise the winter temperature by 20 °C (36 °F) and as much as 30 °C (54 °F) in just a few hours, which may last several days. Calgary's proximity to the Rocky Mountains also affects winter temperatures resulting in a mixture of lows and highs, and tends to result in a mild winter for a city in the Prairie Provinces. Temperatures are also affected by the wind chill factor; Calgary's average wind speed is 14.2 km/h (8.8 mph), one of the highest among Canadian cities. In the summer, daytime temperatures range from 10 to 25 °C (50 to 77 °F) and exceed 30 °C (86 °F) for an average of 5.1 days in June, July, and August, and occasionally as late as September or as early as May. As a consequence of Calgary's high elevation and aridity, summer days are often not humid, unlike many other major cities in Canada. Summer evenings also tend to cool off, with monthly average low temperatures reaching 9 to 10 °C (48 to 50 °F) throughout the summer months. The summer of 1977 saw no dew point above 13.5 °C (56.3 °F). Summer 1911 saw no daily minimum temperature above 12.2 °C (54.0 °F). The summer of 1995 in Calgary saw a maximum yearly temperature of 28.3 °C (82.9 °F), the most recent instance of Calgary recording an entire year where summer does not see temperatures exceeding 29.0 °C (84.2 °F).

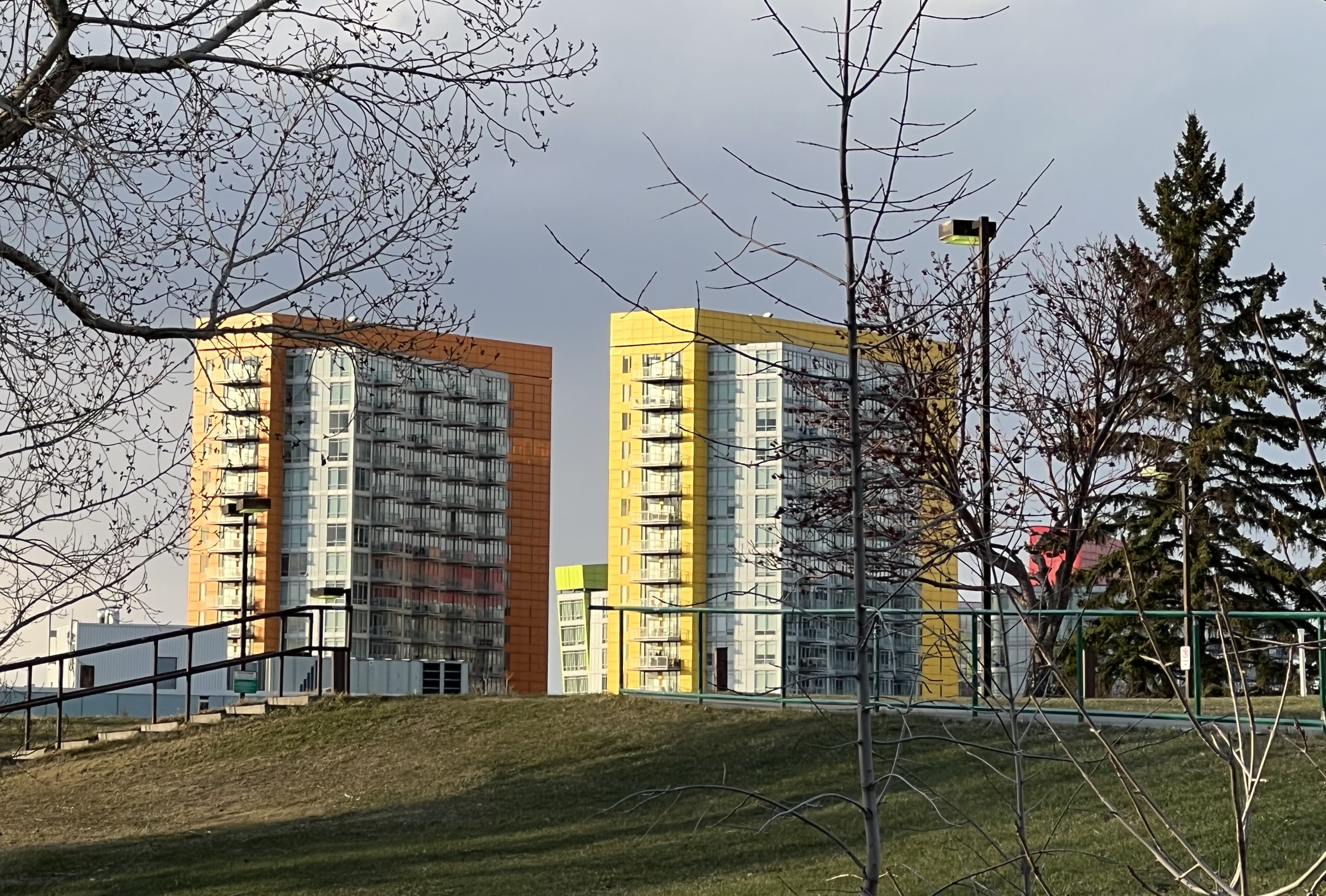
Calgary in spring.

The wettest month is June with an average precipitation of 112.7 millimetres (4.44 in), while the driest month is January with an average precipitation of 10.0 millimetres (0.39 in). Calgary International Airport in the northeastern section of the city receives an average of 418.8 mm (16.49 in) of precipitation annually, with 326.4 mm (12.85 in) of that occurring in the form of rain, and 128.8 cm (50.7 in) as snow. The most rainfall occurs in June and the most snowfall in March. Calgary has also recorded snow every month of the year. It last snowed in July on July 15, 1999. The relatively low amount of precipitation in Calgary, when compared to other cities like Toronto, Vancouver, and Montreal, also gives Calgary a climate close to a cool semi-arid climate (Koppen: BSk, Trewartha: BSlo bordering Bsbo).

Calgary Climate according to major climate systems
Climatic scheme	Initials	Description
Köppen system	Dwb	Monsoon-influenced warm-summer humid continental climate
Trewartha system	Dclo	Warm-summer continental climate

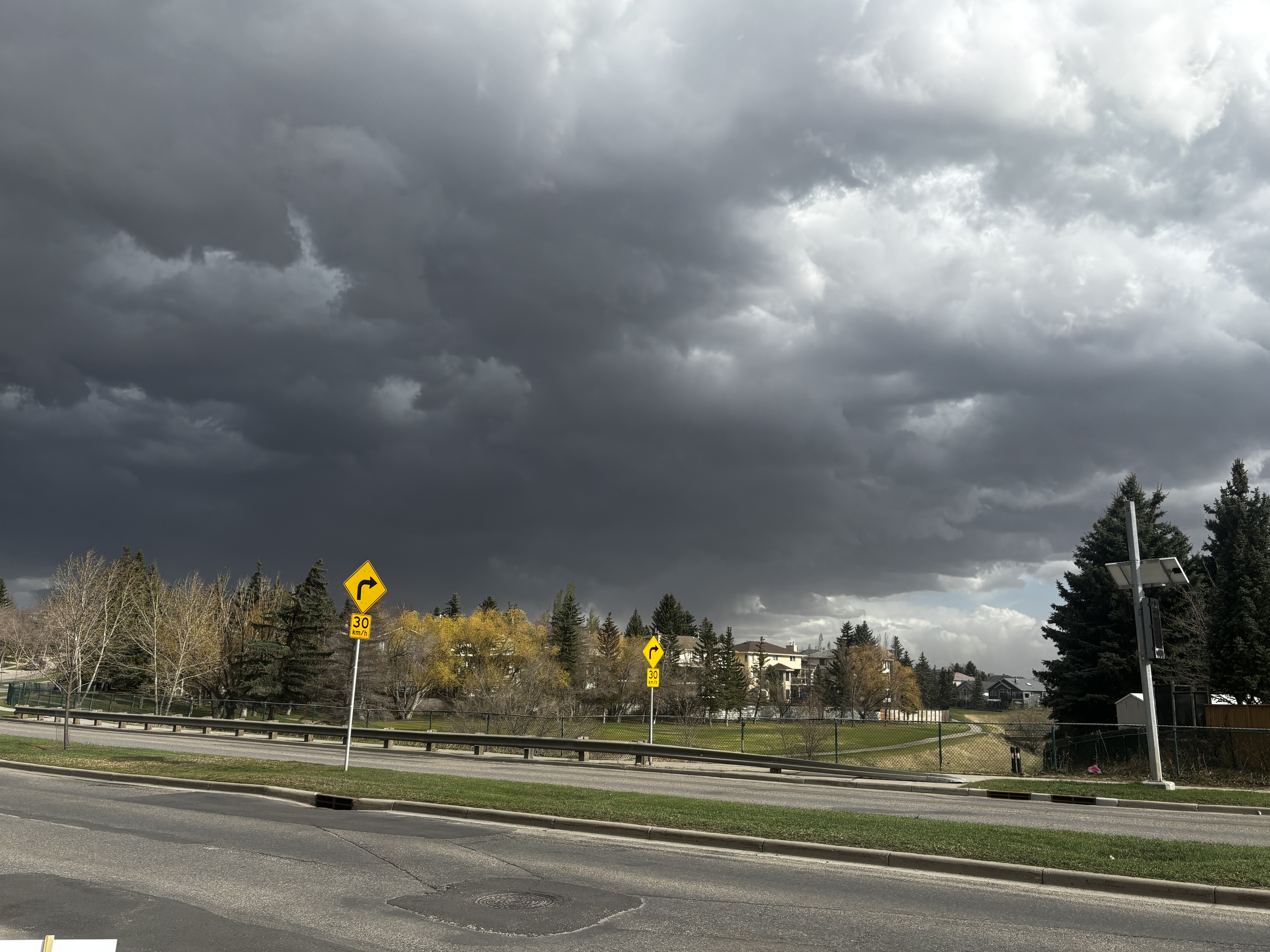
Calgary experiences many thunderstorms.

Thunderstorms can be frequent and sometimes severe, with most of them occurring in the summer months. Calgary lies within Alberta's Hailstorm Alley and is prone to damaging hailstorms every few years. A hailstorm that struck Calgary on September 7, 1991, was one of the most destructive natural disasters in Canadian history, with over $400 million in damage. Further hailstorms struck the city, one on June 13, 2020, causing $1.3 billion in damages. Another occurred on August 5, 2024, became the second-costliest event in Canadian history, as of May 2025, causing $3.25 billion in damage. Being west of the dry line on most occasions, tornadoes are rare in the region.

Calgary has the sunniest days year-round of Canada's 100 largest cities, with slightly over 332 days of sun; it has on average 2,396 hours of sunshine annually, with an average relative humidity of 55% in the winter and 45% in the summer (15:00 MST).

Calgary falls into the NRC Plant Hardiness Zone 4a and USDA zone 4b, as unlike NRC zones, USDA zones are solely based on low temperature. The average low temperature for Calgary is −31.5 °C (−24.7 °F), which would fall under USDA zone 4b.

Calgary has a short growing season, lasting 115 days between May 23 and September 15 on average.

On November 15, 2021, Calgary City Council voted to declare a climate emergency. A climate emergency declaration is a resolution passed by a governing body such as a city council. It puts the local government on record in support of emergency action to respond to climate change and recognizes the pace and scale of action needed. On May 27, 2026, Council voted to rescind its emergency declaration.

== Data ==
Calgary International Airport

Climate chart (precipitation, max. and min. temperature)
J	F	M	A	M	J	J	A	S	O	N	D
10 −2 −14	12 0 −12	18 4 −8	30 11 −2	61 16 3	113 20 8	66 24 10	54 23 9	37 18 5	17 11 −1	16 4 −8	13 0 −12
- █ Average max. and min. temperatures in °C
- █ Precipitation totals in mm
- Source: Environment Canada
Imperial conversion
J	F	M	A	M	J	J	A	S	O	N	D
0.4 29 8	0.5 32 11	0.7 39 17	1.2 51 29	2.4 62 38	4.4 67 46	2.6 74 50	2.1 74 49	1.5 65 40	0.7 52 30	0.6 39 19	0.5 31 10
- █ Average max. and min. temperatures in °F
- █ Precipitation totals in inches

Calgary International Airport maximum records:

- Record high temperature of 36.7 °C (98.1 °F) recorded on August 10, 2018
- Record high daily minimum of 19.1 °C (66.4 °F) recorded on July 24, 2024
- Record high dew point of 21.9 °C (71.4 °F) recorded on July 2, 2013
- Most humid month with an average monthly dew point of 12.3 °C (54.1 °F) recorded during July 2007
- Warmest month with an average monthly mean temperature of 21.0 °C (69.8 °F) recorded during July 2024
  - Warmest monthly average daily minimum of 13.8 °C (56.8 °F) recorded during July 2024
  - Warmest monthly average daily maximum of 28.7 °C (83.7 °F) recorded during July 1936
  - July 1936 saw no daily maximum temperature below 23.9 °C (75.0 °F)
  - July 2021 saw no temperature below 9.3 °C (48.7 °F)
  - August 2004 saw no dew point below 4.6 °C (40.3 °F)

The average yearly maximum daily minimum temperature is 15.6 °C (60.1 °F) and the average yearly maximum dew point is 17.2 °C (63.0 °F) at Calgary International Airport.

Climate data for Calgary (Calgary International Airport) WMO ID: 71877; coordinates 51°06′50″N 114°01′13″W; elevation: 1,084.1 m (3,557 ft); 1991–2020 normals, extremes 1881–present
Month	Jan	Feb	Mar	Apr	May	Jun	Jul	Aug	Sep	Oct	Nov	Dec	Year
Record high humidex	17.3	21.9	25.2	27.2	31.6	37.0	36.9	36.4	32.9	28.7	22.6	19.4	37.0
Record high °C (°F)	17.6 (63.7)	22.6 (72.7)	25.4 (77.7)	29.4 (84.9)	32.4 (90.3)	36.3 (97.3)	36.3 (97.3)	36.7 (98.1)	33.3 (91.9)	29.4 (84.9)	23.1 (73.6)	19.5 (67.1)	36.7 (98.1)
Mean maximum °C (°F)	12.0 (53.6)	12.5 (54.5)	16.2 (61.2)	22.0 (71.6)	26.4 (79.5)	27.6 (81.7)	30.8 (87.4)	31.5 (88.7)	28.3 (82.9)	22.5 (72.5)	15.6 (60.1)	11.2 (52.2)	32.4 (90.3)
Mean daily maximum °C (°F)	−1.5 (29.3)	0.1 (32.2)	3.8 (38.8)	10.8 (51.4)	16.4 (61.5)	19.7 (67.5)	23.5 (74.3)	23.1 (73.6)	18.3 (64.9)	11.1 (52.0)	4.1 (39.4)	−0.4 (31.3)	10.8 (51.4)
Daily mean °C (°F)	−7.6 (18.3)	−5.9 (21.4)	−2.2 (28.0)	4.5 (40.1)	9.9 (49.8)	13.7 (56.7)	16.9 (62.4)	16.2 (61.2)	11.5 (52.7)	4.9 (40.8)	−1.7 (28.9)	−6.3 (20.7)	4.5 (40.1)
Mean daily minimum °C (°F)	−13.5 (7.7)	−11.8 (10.8)	−8.1 (17.4)	−1.9 (28.6)	3.4 (38.1)	7.7 (45.9)	10.2 (50.4)	9.2 (48.6)	4.7 (40.5)	−1.3 (29.7)	−7.5 (18.5)	−12.1 (10.2)	−1.8 (28.8)
Mean minimum °C (°F)	−27.9 (−18.2)	−23.3 (−9.9)	−21.0 (−5.8)	−10.4 (13.3)	−3.5 (25.7)	2.2 (36.0)	5.1 (41.2)	3.7 (38.7)	−1.9 (28.6)	−11.0 (12.2)	−19.8 (−3.6)	−24.6 (−12.3)	−31.6 (−24.9)
Record low °C (°F)	−44.4 (−47.9)	−45 (−49)	−37.2 (−35.0)	−30 (−22)	−16.7 (1.9)	−3.3 (26.1)	−0.6 (30.9)	−3.2 (26.2)	−13.3 (8.1)	−25.7 (−14.3)	−35 (−31)	−42.8 (−45.0)	−45 (−49)
Record low wind chill	−52.1	−52.6	−44.7	−37.1	−23.7	−5.8	0.0	−4.1	−12.5	−34.3	−47.9	−55.1	−55.1
Average precipitation mm (inches)	10.0 (0.39)	11.8 (0.46)	17.7 (0.70)	29.6 (1.17)	61.1 (2.41)	112.7 (4.44)	65.7 (2.59)	53.8 (2.12)	37.1 (1.46)	17.1 (0.67)	16.3 (0.64)	12.5 (0.49)	445.4 (17.54)
Average rainfall mm (inches)	0.1 (0.00)	0.1 (0.00)	1.1 (0.04)	12.6 (0.50)	52.5 (2.07)	112.5 (4.43)	65.7 (2.59)	53.5 (2.11)	33.8 (1.33)	8.3 (0.33)	1.7 (0.07)	0.3 (0.01)	342.2 (13.47)
Average snowfall cm (inches)	16.6 (6.5)	16.9 (6.7)	23.8 (9.4)	22.9 (9.0)	9.6 (3.8)	0.2 (0.1)	0.0 (0.0)	0.0 (0.0)	2.2 (0.9)	11.5 (4.5)	18.8 (7.4)	16.3 (6.4)	138.7 (54.6)
Average precipitation days (≥ 0.2 mm)	7.4	7.8	8.8	9.8	11.1	14.5	12.9	10.4	8.3	7.8	8.0	7.2	114.0
Average rainy days (≥ 0.2 mm)	0.3	0.22	0.83	4.8	10.0	14.5	12.9	10.0	7.7	4.4	1.5	0.22	67.4
Average snowy days (≥ 0.2 cm)	7.8	7.9	9.3	7.0	2.4	0.08	0.0	0.13	0.96	4.6	7.1	7.7	55.0
Average relative humidity (%) (at 1500 LST)	55.7	54.7	50.2	42.7	43.8	49.2	46.8	44.3	44.3	45.3	54.2	56.3	49.0
Average dew point °C (°F)	−13.1 (8.4)	−12.0 (10.4)	−8.9 (16.0)	−4.5 (23.9)	0.8 (33.4)	6.1 (43.0)	9.1 (48.4)	7.8 (46.0)	3.0 (37.4)	−3.1 (26.4)	−8.3 (17.1)	−12.5 (9.5)	−3.0 (26.6)
Mean monthly sunshine hours	119.5	144.6	177.2	220.2	249.4	269.9	314.1	284.0	207.0	175.4	121.1	114.0	2,396.3
Percentage possible sunshine	45.6	51.3	48.2	53.1	51.8	54.6	63.1	62.9	54.4	52.7	45.0	46.0	52.4
Average ultraviolet index	1	1	2	4	6	7	7	6	4	2	1	0	3
Source: Environment and Climate Change Canada, weatherstats.ca (dew point, mean maxima/minima) and Weather Atlas (for UV index)

Climate data for Calgary Olympic Park (Canada Olympic Park) coordinates 51°04′47″N 114°12′57″W; elevation: 1,190 m (3,900 ft); normals 1995-2024
Month	Jan	Feb	Mar	Apr	May	Jun	Jul	Aug	Sep	Oct	Nov	Dec	Year
Record high humidex	0	0	0	—	28	37	41	47	37	—	28	0	47
Record high °C (°F)	19.9 (67.8)	20.7 (69.3)	23.6 (74.5)	27.6 (81.7)	30.5 (86.9)	36.2 (97.2)	36.0 (96.8)	34.5 (94.1)	32.8 (91.0)	26.6 (79.9)	21.3 (70.3)	17.6 (63.7)	36.2 (97.2)
Mean maximum °C (°F)	11.2 (52.2)	10.9 (51.6)	15.3 (59.5)	21.9 (71.4)	26.0 (78.8)	27.4 (81.3)	31.1 (88.0)	31.2 (88.2)	27.9 (82.2)	21.7 (71.1)	15.3 (59.5)	10.1 (50.2)	32.1 (89.8)
Mean daily maximum °C (°F)	−0.8 (30.6)	−0.3 (31.5)	3.8 (38.8)	10.2 (50.4)	16.0 (60.8)	19.4 (66.9)	23.5 (74.3)	22.9 (73.2)	17.9 (64.2)	10.7 (51.3)	3.4 (38.1)	−1.3 (29.7)	10.5 (50.9)
Daily mean °C (°F)	−5.5 (22.1)	−5.3 (22.5)	−1.7 (28.9)	4.4 (39.9)	9.8 (49.6)	13.5 (56.3)	17.0 (62.6)	16.3 (61.3)	11.7 (53.1)	5.3 (41.5)	−1.4 (29.5)	−5.8 (21.6)	5.0 (41.0)
Mean daily minimum °C (°F)	−10.2 (13.6)	−10.2 (13.6)	−7.1 (19.2)	−1.5 (29.3)	3.6 (38.5)	7.6 (45.7)	10.4 (50.7)	9.6 (49.3)	5.5 (41.9)	−0.1 (31.8)	−6.1 (21.0)	−10.3 (13.5)	−0.6 (30.9)
Mean minimum °C (°F)	−25.6 (−14.1)	−21.6 (−6.9)	−20.5 (−4.9)	−9.6 (14.7)	−3.1 (26.4)	2.4 (36.3)	5.5 (41.9)	3.7 (38.7)	−1.7 (28.9)	−9.8 (14.4)	−18.2 (−0.8)	−23.3 (−9.9)	−30.6 (−23.1)
Record low °C (°F)	−40.0 (−40.0)	−32.6 (−26.7)	−32.2 (−26.0)	−19.2 (−2.6)	−8.3 (17.1)	−1.5 (29.3)	1.3 (34.3)	0.9 (33.6)	−8.0 (17.6)	−19.1 (−2.4)	−31.4 (−24.5)	−35.0 (−31.0)	−40.0 (−40.0)
Record low wind chill	−50	−44	−39	−28	−18	−4	0	0	−13	−26	−40	−46	−50
Average precipitation mm (inches)	8.0 (0.31)	9.2 (0.36)	13.7 (0.54)	28.8 (1.13)	56.7 (2.23)	99.4 (3.91)	49.2 (1.94)	44.3 (1.74)	33.0 (1.30)	17.5 (0.69)	12.4 (0.49)	10.5 (0.41)	382.7 (15.05)
Average dew point °C (°F)	−12.6 (9.3)	−11.7 (10.9)	−9.2 (15.4)	−5.1 (22.8)	−0.1 (31.8)	5.4 (41.7)	8.5 (47.3)	7.2 (45.0)	2.8 (37.0)	−3.2 (26.2)	−8.4 (16.9)	−12.3 (9.9)	−3.2 (26.2)
Source: weatherstats.ca

Climate data for Springbank Hill (Calgary/Springbank Airport) WMO ID: 71860; coordinates 51°06′11″N 114°22′28″W; elevation: 1,200.9 m (3,940 ft); 1981–2010 normals
Month	Jan	Feb	Mar	Apr	May	Jun	Jul	Aug	Sep	Oct	Nov	Dec	Year
Record high humidex	15.7	21.3	22.9	25.7	30.6	31.9	34.1	34.0	31.0	26.4	20.5	17.1	34.1
Record high °C (°F)	16.5 (61.7)	22.1 (71.8)	23.8 (74.8)	26.5 (79.7)	33.0 (91.4)	31.0 (87.8)	33.8 (92.8)	32.1 (89.8)	30.6 (87.1)	27.1 (80.8)	20.4 (68.7)	17.9 (64.2)	33.8 (92.8)
Mean daily maximum °C (°F)	−1.8 (28.8)	0.0 (32.0)	3.9 (39.0)	10.5 (50.9)	15.3 (59.5)	18.8 (65.8)	22.2 (72.0)	21.2 (70.2)	17.0 (62.6)	11.0 (51.8)	2.3 (36.1)	−0.6 (30.9)	10.0 (50.0)
Daily mean °C (°F)	−8.2 (17.2)	−6.7 (19.9)	−2.7 (27.1)	3.4 (38.1)	8.1 (46.6)	12.1 (53.8)	14.8 (58.6)	13.7 (56.7)	9.5 (49.1)	3.9 (39.0)	−3.8 (25.2)	−7 (19)	3.1 (37.5)
Mean daily minimum °C (°F)	−14.5 (5.9)	−13.4 (7.9)	−9.2 (15.4)	−3.8 (25.2)	0.9 (33.6)	5.4 (41.7)	7.4 (45.3)	6.2 (43.2)	1.9 (35.4)	−3.3 (26.1)	−9.9 (14.2)	−13.3 (8.1)	−3.8 (25.2)
Record low °C (°F)	−42.8 (−45.0)	−41.6 (−42.9)	−36.3 (−33.3)	−21.7 (−7.1)	−14.1 (6.6)	−6.1 (21.0)	−0.1 (31.8)	−5.9 (21.4)	−9.8 (14.4)	−29.1 (−20.4)	−36.5 (−33.7)	−41.6 (−42.9)	−42.8 (−45.0)
Record low wind chill	−56.0	−56.0	−48.0	−27.0	−20.0	−10.0	−4.0	−8.0	−14.0	−38.0	−48.0	−57.0	−57.0
Average precipitation mm (inches)	9.9 (0.39)	11.5 (0.45)	17.6 (0.69)	25.4 (1.00)	61.1 (2.41)	106.7 (4.20)	66.9 (2.63)	78.0 (3.07)	50.3 (1.98)	16.3 (0.64)	16.3 (0.64)	9.8 (0.39)	469.8 (18.49)
Average rainfall mm (inches)	0.2 (0.01)	0.0 (0.0)	0.4 (0.02)	9.3 (0.37)	49.5 (1.95)	106.7 (4.20)	66.9 (2.63)	78.0 (3.07)	45.5 (1.79)	7.0 (0.28)	2.4 (0.09)	0.3 (0.01)	366.2 (14.42)
Average snowfall cm (inches)	12.7 (5.0)	14.7 (5.8)	21.7 (8.5)	19.0 (7.5)	12.4 (4.9)	0.0 (0.0)	0.1 (0.0)	0.0 (0.0)	5.3 (2.1)	11.6 (4.6)	17.4 (6.9)	12.4 (4.9)	127.3 (50.2)
Average precipitation days (≥ 0.2 mm)	5.8	5.7	7.5	8.1	11.6	14.5	12.8	12.4	9.4	7.2	6.0	5.3	106.3
Average rainy days (≥ 0.2 mm)	0.17	0.04	0.48	3.5	9.7	14.5	12.8	12.3	8.8	4.3	0.91	0.23	67.73
Average snowy days (≥ 0.2 cm)	6.0	5.9	7.6	5.8	3.0	0.0	0.09	0.05	1.4	3.9	5.9	5.4	45.0
Average relative humidity (%)	58.6	56.0	50.3	43.3	45.7	50.8	48.2	49.2	47.8	46.5	57.1	60.4	51.2
Source: Environment Canada
