= Media coverage of tropical cyclones =

Media coverage of tropical cyclones has been carried out in various ways over the past centuries. The passages of hurricanes, typhoons, cyclones, and tropical storms have been reported through newspapers, word of mouth, and telegraph.

Since the early to mid-20th century, technological advances have included radio, television, newsreel footage shown in theaters, mass media, and more recently, the internet. Internet coverage encompasses blogs and online news sites that report data on tropical cyclones.

This article covers the various methods by which the media report tropical cyclones and their effects.

== Printed media ==
=== Newspaper ===
Newspaper reports on tropical cyclones and their effects have been in existence since the days before advances in communication in the mid–19th century. Local and national newspapers, such as the New York Times and the Washington Post, have reported the passage of tropical cyclones and their effects. News agencies, including the Associated Press, Reuters, and United Press International, also report on the passage and effects of tropical cyclones.

=== Magazines ===
Magazines publish stories written about tropical cyclones either during or after the event. Certain magazines permit more freedom in narrative structure, allowing articles to explore different aspects of a tropical cyclone. In the early years, reports on tropical cyclones were written in news magazines like Time or in magazines pertaining to science and meteorology like Weatherwise, Monthly Weather Review, and National Geographic. However, in the 21st century, coverage of tropical cyclones and their effects has been featured in a wider range of magazines, including Vanity Fair and Forbes.

=== Books ===
Books have been written about tropical cyclones in general, as well as the history of specific tropical cyclones, such as the 1900 Galveston Hurricane or Hurricane Katrina. These books are written by professional meteorologists, scientists, and ordinary people. Some notable examples of books about tropical cyclones include Issac's Storm and Florida Hurricanes History.

== Electronic media ==
=== Telegraph ===
Before the invention of the radio, electronic media coverage of tropical cyclones was limited to the telegraph, which was invented in 1839. A notable example of telegraph coverage of tropical cyclones occurred during the 1900 Galveston Hurricane

=== Radio ===
Along with the telegraph, radio was also used to cover tropical cyclones. This practice began as early as the 1900s. WX4NHC, an amateur radio station operated by the National Hurricane Center, serves as an example.
