= David K. Hoadley =

American pioneer of storm chasing

David Hoadley
- Born: 1938 (age 87–88); Spencer, Indiana, USA
- Education: Indiana University Bloomington (B.A.); University of Virginia (M.A.)
- Known for: Earliest known storm chaser; founded Storm Track magazine
- Children: Sarah Hoadley
- Relatives: Nancy Lindsay (granddaughter)

David K. Hoadley (born 1938) is an American pioneer of storm chasing and the first widely recognized storm chaser, as well as the founder and former editor of Storm Track magazine. He is also a sketch artist and photographer.

== Biography ==
Hoadley's interest in storms and severe weather began shortly after he graduated from high school, when a severe thunderstorm caused straight-line wind damage to trees and power lines throughout his hometown of Bismarck, North Dakota, in June 1956. Following this, he chased locally and then for several springs roamed Kansas and Oklahoma. He earned a B.A. in political science from Indiana University Bloomington in 1960 and a M.A. in foreign affairs from the University of Virginia in 1962. After graduate school he volunteered for Army Reserve Officers' Training Corps, went to intelligence school, and chose to be stationed in Fort Riley, Kansas, in "Tornado Alley", as a lieutenant. Hoadley later made a career at the Environmental Protection Agency and retired in 2003. He continues to reside in Virginia.

Hoadley founded Storm Track in 1977 following an impromptu meeting with a handful of early storm chasers at the American Meteorological Society's 10th Conference on Severe Local Storms in Omaha, Nebraska. It began as a newsletter to connect widely dispersed chasers. Hoadley edited Storm Track from 1977 to 1986, after which it was handed off to Tim Marshall and soon assumed a magazine format. He continued submitting writing, photographs, and sketches to the magazine. He has written for the World Meteorological Organization and wrote a refereed article on a tornado spawned by Hurricane David. He also provided advice and sketches for Storm Talk, the Storm Chase Manual, Tornado Talk, and the Storm Chasing Handbook. Although he generally eschews publicity, Hoadley has occasionally allowed journalists to join him on chases or granted interviews. He and his photographs have appeared in publications around the world, including Time-Life, National Geographic, Scientific American, the Chicago Tribune, and USA Today. On television, he has appeared on National Geographic Explorer, ABC's Day One, and The History Channel.

A meticulous record-keeper, Hoadley taught himself meteorology and developed a pattern recognition-based forecasting method, primarily using surface data. He has witnessed 272 tornadoes and driven approximately 750,000 miles (1,210,000 km) while chasing. Many of these miles accumulated because he frequently drove to the Great Plains from his home in Virginia. He delivered a keynote speech about his storm chasing career – then in its 50th year – at the 2006 Texas Severe Storms Association National Storm Conference, where he was honored in a tribute dinner.

== See also ==
- Neil Ward
- Roger Jensen
