= Cassino to Korea =

- Directed by: Eugene Genock
- Screenplay by: Max Klein
- Produced by: A.J. Richard
- Starring: Quentin Reynolds; Jackson Beck; James W. Logan; David Ludlum
- Cinematography: João Fernandes
- Edited by: Morrie Roizman; M. Edward Salier
- Music by: Richard DuPage; Winston Sharples; George Steiner
- Production company: CNI Cinema
- Distributed by: Paramount Pictures
- Release date: October 3, 1950
- Running time: 55 minutes
- Country: United States
- Language: English

Cassino to Korea is a 1950 American documentary film directed by Eugene Genock. The film stars Quentin Reynolds, Jackson Beck, James W. Logan and David Ludlum. The film was released on October 3, 1950, by Paramount Pictures.

== Overview ==
Using newsreel footage of the Allied forces' Italian campaign of World War II, the film aims to draw parallels to then-current Korean War. The film uses captured footage and United States Army Signal Corps materials to comprehensively review the Italian campaign, augmented by re-enactments detailing the experiences of a Medal of Honor recipient (Logan) and an unsung hero (Ludlum) from the campaign. Both individuals portray themselves in the re-enactments presented in this account.

== Plot ==
Sgt. James M. Logan and Capt. David Ludlum recreate their wartime experiences. Logan, a member of the 36th Infantry Division, eliminates a German machine-gun nest and single-handedly captures a German officer during the intense fighting at the Salerno beachhead. Meanwhile, Captain Ludlum, a United States Army Air Forces weatherman, accurately predicts a crucial weather break during the Battle of Monte Cassino, leading to the strategic launch of the Allied attack.

== Cast ==
- Quentin Reynolds as Commentator
- Jackson Beck as Commentator
- James W. Logan as Sergeant James W. Logan
- David Ludlum as Sergeant David Ludlum
