= Snowden D. Flora =

American meteorologist and climatologist

- Born: 1879
- Died: 1957 (aged 77–78)
- Known for: Tornado and hail history, climate studies
- Scientific career
- Fields: Meteorology, Climatology
- Institutions: U.S. Weather Bureau, Kansas State Board of Agriculture

Snowden Dwight Flora (1879–1957) was an American meteorologist and climatologist best known for studies of the history of weather events such as tornadoes and hail. His book, Tornadoes of the United States, was the only even modestly advanced book on the subject available for many years and influenced an entire generation of meteorologists as well as contributed to the advancement of the field as a compilation of material unavailable elsewhere. Its many uniquely available photographs and engaging anecdotes helped make it easily the best selling book in the history of the University of Oklahoma Press at the time.

== Selected works ==
Flora published many articles and books in his lifetime. Here are some:

- Flora, Snowden D. Climate of Kansas.
- --- Tornadoes of the United States. Norman, OK: University of Oklahoma Press, 1953. ISBN 0-8061-0262-4. (reprinted, Jun 1973)
- --- Hailstorms of the United States. Norman, OK: University of Oklahoma Press, May 1956. ISBN 0-8061-0359-0.

== See also ==
- John Park Finley
- David M. Ludlum
- Thomas P. Grazulis
