= GRLevelX =

Meteorology software

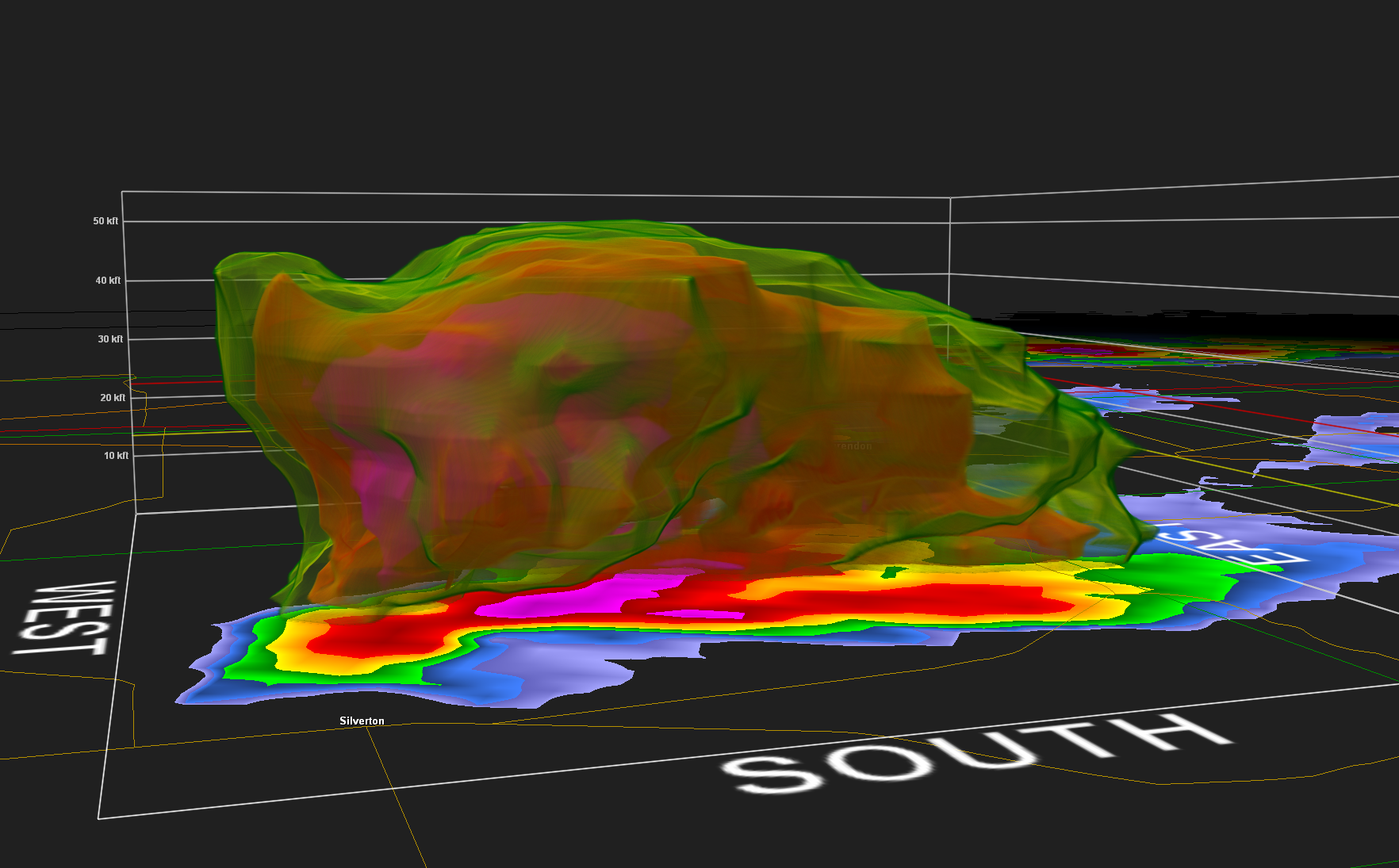
- GR2Analyst of a rain storm.
- Original author: Michael Scott Gibson
- Developers: Gibson Ridge Software, LLC
- Release: 22 October 2004; 22 years ago
- Website: www.grlevelx.com

GRLevelX is a suite of data processing and display programs developed by Gibson Ridge Software, LLC (GRS), to view weather radar data. It went on the market on October 22, 2004, with the release of GRLevel3. It comes in three versions, all of which ingest raw data: GRLevel2 and GRLevel2 Analyst Edition for viewing Level II data of the National Weather Service (NWS), and GRLevel3 for viewing Level III data. All programs are capable of rendering dual polarization data.

The software allows the user to view real-time data as well as archive data stored locally or obtained over the internet. It is used by professional forecasters and researchers for general precipitation analysis as well as severe storm, tornado, and tropical cyclone monitoring and analysis. Its usage base grew to include many television weathercasters, including by The Weather Channel severe storms expert Greg Forbes, as well as storm chasers, storm spotters, emergency managers, weather enthusiasts, private sector meteorologists, and is often used within the NWS, itself.

GRLevel2 Analyst Edition allows the user to take a 3D images of precipitation within clouds, such as in supercell thunderstorms. Its integrated algorithms flag possible hail, tornado vortex signatures (TVSs), and mesocyclones.

All GRx applications are written in multithreaded C++ using the base Windows APIs. Software engineer Michael Scott Gibson wrote the programs.

== Overview ==
GRLevel2 is a Windows viewer for live and archived NEXRAD Level II data (volumetric reflectivity and velocity data). Base reflectivity, base velocity, storm relative velocity, and spectrum width sweeps for all radar tilts can be ingested. The display has high speed zooming and panning to allow the user a quickly focus on the area of interest.

GRLevel2 Analyst Edition is an advanced NEXRAD Level II analysis application to produce a high quality volumetric display and several high resolution reflectivity-derived graphical products in addition to the standard Level II data products. Through GIS implementation, several University-Doppler Radars can be viewed, such as the University of Missouri's X-Band Radar.

GRLevel3 is a Windows viewer for live NEXRAD Level III data from the NWS Radar Product Central Collection Dissemination Service (already produced 2D images). In addition to Level III WSR-88D data, GR3 supports TDWR, which is high resolution shorter range radar located at some major airports.

Gibson also wrote GREarth, which overlays satellite and other data and, like the GRLevelX radar viewers, is customizable with GIS layers.

=== Algorithms ===
GR2Analyst contains algorithms flagging certain features in the reflectivity data. In reflectivities, GR2 extract the height above ground of the highest elevation where they are greater than 18 dBZ (echo tops), the vertically integrated liquid water content of clouds (VIL) and the VIL divided by the Echo tops which is an indicator of possible large hail. Further algorithm use environmental information about of 0 °C (32 °F) and −20 °C (−4 °F) heights, inputted by the user, to output a hail algorithm size. The algorithm uses any temp/height data within 48 hours of the volume scan time. If no recent data is found, it defaults to 10,000 feet (3,000 m) and 20,000 feet (6,100 m) for the heights.

The results are displayed with a high resolution of 1 kilometre (0.62 mi) x 1 ° x 230 kilometres (140 mi) grid with 256 data levels. There is an automatic extraction of the storm motion which is integrated in the algorithms for corrections.
