= Storm chasing =

Pursuit of severe weather conditions

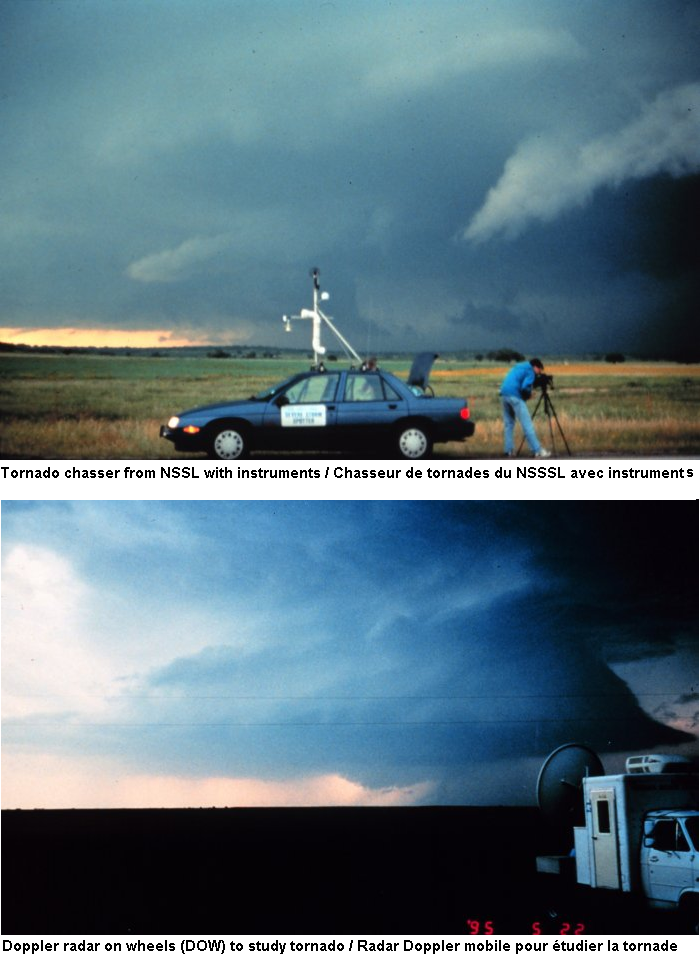
Photos from National Severe Storms Laboratory (NSSL) in Norman, Oklahoma show staff and instrument chasing tornadoes during the first VORTEX project from 1994 to 1995. The first photo was in Graham, Texas, and the second southeast of Shamrock, Texas.

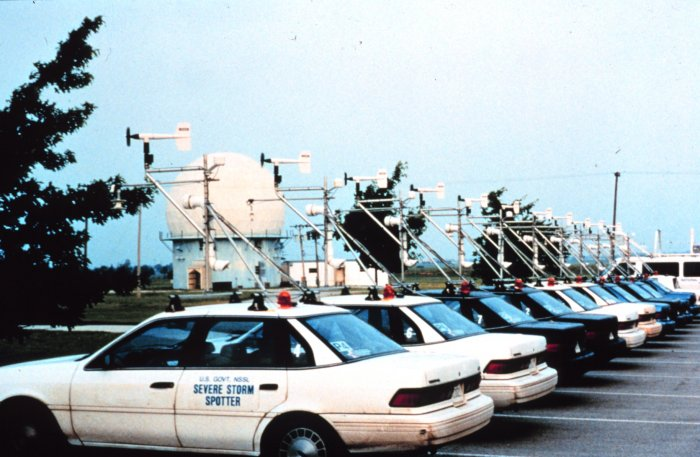
NSSL mobile mesonet vehicles on the first VORTEX project (which operated in the seasons of 1994 – 1995), equipped with surface measurement equipment.

Storm chasing is broadly defined as the deliberate pursuit of any severe weather phenomenon, regardless of motive, but most commonly for curiosity, adventure, scientific investigation, or for news or media coverage. A person who chases storms is known as a storm chaser (or a "chaser" for short).

While witnessing a tornado is the single biggest objective for most chasers, many chase thunderstorms and delight in viewing cumulonimbus and related cloud structures, watching a barrage of hail and lightning, and seeing what skyscapes unfold. A smaller number of storm chasers attempt to intercept tropical cyclones, waterspouts, blizzards, ice storms, and other weather phenomena.

== Nature of and motivations for chasing ==
Storm chasing is chiefly a recreational endeavor, with chasers usually giving their motives as photographing or video recording a storm, or for various personal reasons. These can include the beauty of the views afforded by the sky and land, the mystery of not knowing precisely what will unfold, the journey to an undetermined destination on the open road, intangible experiences such as feeling one with a much larger and more powerful natural world, the challenge of correctly forecasting and intercepting storms with optimal vantage points, and pure thrill seeking. Some chasers do it for money or competition, although chasers typically work together as well.

Although scientific work is sometimes cited as a goal, direct participation in such work is almost always impractical during the actual chase except for chasers collaborating in an organized university or government project. Many chasers also act as storm spotters, reporting their observations of hazardous weather to relevant authorities. These reports greatly benefit real-time warnings with ground truth information, as well as science as a whole by increasing the reliability of severe storm databases used in climatology and other research (which ultimately boosts forecast and warning skill). Some recreational chasers submit photos and videos to researchers as well as to the U.S. National Weather Service (NWS) for spotter training.

Storm chasers are not generally paid to chase, with the exception of television media crews in certain television market areas, video stringers and photographers (freelancers mostly, but some staff), and researchers such as graduate meteorologists and professors. An increasing number sell storm videos and pictures and manage to make a profit.

A few operate "chase tour" services, making storm chasing a recently developed form of niche tourism. Financial returns usually are relatively meager given the expenses of chasing, with most chasers spending more than they take in and very few making a living solely from chasing. Chasers are also generally limited by the duration of the season in which severe storms are most likely to develop, usually the local spring and/or summer.

No degree or certification is required to be a storm chaser, and many chases are mounted independently by amateurs and enthusiasts without formal training. Local National Weather Service offices do hold storm spotter training classes, usually early in the spring. Some offices collaborate to produce severe weather workshops oriented toward operational meteorologists.

Storm chasers come from a wide variety of occupational and socioeconomic backgrounds. Though a fair number are professional meteorologists, most storm chasers are from other occupational fields, which may include any number of professions that have little or nothing to do with meteorology. A relatively high proportion possess college degrees and a large number live in the central and southern United States. Many are lovers of nature with interests that also include flora, fauna, geology, volcanoes, aurora, meteors, eclipses, and other aspects of astronomy.

== History ==
The first person to gain public recognition as a storm chaser was David Hoadley (born 1938), who began chasing North Dakota storms in 1956, systematically using data from area weather offices and airports. He is widely considered the pioneer storm chaser and was the founder and first editor of Storm Track magazine.

Neil B. Ward (1914–1972) subsequently brought research chasing to the forefront in the 1950s and 1960s, enlisting the help of the Oklahoma Highway Patrol to study storms. His work pioneered modern storm spotting and made institutional chasing a reality.

The first coordinated storm chasing activity sponsored by institutions was undertaken as part of the Alberta Hail Studies project beginning in 1969. Vehicles were outfitted with various meteorological instrumentation and hail-catching apparatus and were directed into suspected hail regions of thunderstorms by a controller at a radar site. The controller communicated with the vehicles by radio.

In 1972, the University of Oklahoma (OU) in cooperation with the National Severe Storms Laboratory (NSSL) began the Tornado Intercept Project, with the first outing taking place on 19 April of that year. This was the first large-scale tornado chasing activity sponsored by an institution. It culminated in a brilliant success in 1973 with the Union City, Oklahoma tornado providing a foundation for tornado and supercell morphology that proved the efficacy of storm chasing field research. The project produced the first legion of veteran storm chasers, with Hoadley's Storm Track magazine bringing the community together in 1977.

Storm chasing then reached popular culture in three major spurts: in 1978 with the broadcast of an episode of the television program In Search of...; in 1985 with a documentary on the PBS series Nova; and in May 1996 with the theatrical release of Twister, a Hollywood blockbuster which provided an action-packed but heavily fictionalized glimpse of the hobby. Further early exposure to storm chasing resulted from notable magazine articles, beginning in the late 1970s in Weatherwise magazine.

Various television programs and increased coverage of severe weather by the news media, especially since the initial video revolution in which VHS ownership became widespread by the early 1990s, substantially elevated awareness of and interest in storms and storm chasing. The Internet in particular has contributed to a significant increase in the number of storm chasers since the mid-to-late 1990s. A sharp increase in the general public impulsively wandering about their local area in search of tornadoes similarly is largely attributable to these factors. The 2007–2011 Discovery Channel reality series Storm Chasers produced another surge in activity. Over the years the nature of chasing and the characteristics of chasers shifted.

From their advent in the 1970s until the mid-1990s, scientific field projects were occasionally conducted in the Great Plains during the spring. The first of the seminal VORTEX projects occurred in 1994–1995 and was soon followed by various field experiments each spring, with another large project, VORTEX2, in 2009–2010. Since the mid-1990s, most storm chasing science, with the notable exception of large field projects, consists of mobile Doppler weather radar intercepts.

== Typical storm chase ==
Chasing often involves driving thousands of miles in order to witness the relatively short window of time of active severe thunderstorms. It is not uncommon for a chaser to end up empty handed on any particular day. Storm chasers' degrees of involvement, competencies, philosophies, and techniques vary widely, but many chasers spend a significant amount of time forecasting, both before going on the road as well as during the chase, utilizing various sources for weather data. Most storm chasers are not meteorologists, and many chasers expend significant time and effort in learning meteorology and the intricacies of severe convective storm prediction through both study and experience.

Besides the copious driving to, from, and during chases, storm chasing is punctuated with contrasting periods of long waiting and ceaseless action. Downtime can consist of sitting under sun-baked skies for hours, playing pickup sports, evaluating data, or visiting landmarks while awaiting convective initiation. During an inactive pattern, this downtime can persist for days. When storms are occurring, there is often little or no time to eat or relieve oneself and finding fuel can cause frustrating delays and detours.

Navigating obstacles such as rivers and areas with inadequate road networks is a paramount concern. Only a handful of chasers decide to chase in Dixie Alley, an area of the Southern United States in which trees and road networks heavily obscure the storms and often large tornadoes. The combination of driving and waiting has been likened to "extreme sitting". A "bust" occurs when storms do not fire, sometimes referred to as "severe clear", when storms fire but are missed, when storms fire but are meager, or when storms fire after dusk.

Most chasing is accomplished by driving a motor vehicle of any make or model, whether it be a sedan, van, pickup truck, or SUV, however, a few individuals occasionally fly planes and television stations in some markets use helicopters. Research projects sometimes employ aircraft, as well.

== Geographical, seasonal, and diurnal activity ==
Storm chasers are most active in the spring and early summer, particularly May and June, across the Great Plains of the United States (extending into Canada) in an area colloquially known as Tornado Alley, with many hundred individuals active on some days during this period. This coincides with the most consistent tornado days in the most desirable topography of the Great Plains. Not only are the most intense supercells common there, but due to the moisture profile of the atmosphere the storms tend to be more visible than locations farther east where there are also frequent severe thunderstorms. There is a tendency for chases earlier in the year to be farther south, shifting farther north with the jet stream as the season progresses. Storms occurring later in the year tend to be more isolated and slower moving, both of which are also desirable to chasers.

Chasers may operate whenever significant thunderstorm activity is occurring, whatever the date. This most commonly includes more sporadic activity occurring in warmer months of the year bounding the spring maximum, such as the active month of April and to a lesser extent March. The focus in the summer months is the Central or Northern Plains states and the Prairie Provinces, the Upper Midwest, or on to just east of the Colorado Front Range. An annually inconsistent and substantially smaller peak of severe thunderstorm and tornado activity also arises in the transitional months of autumn, particularly October and November. This follows a pattern somewhat the reverse of the spring pattern with the focus beginning in the north then dropping south and with an overall eastward shift. In the area with the most consistent significant tornado activity, the Southern Plains, the tornado season is intense but is relatively brief whereas central to northern and eastern areas experience less intense and consistent activity that is diffused over a longer span of the year.

Advancing technology since the mid-2000s led to chasers more commonly targeting less amenable areas (i.e. hilly or forested) that were previously eschewed when continuous wide visibility was critical. These advancements, particularly in-vehicle weather data such as radar, also led to an increase in chasing after nightfall. Most chasing remains during daylight hours with active storm intercepting peaking from mid-late afternoon through early-to-mid evening. This is dictated by a chaser's schedule (availability to chase) and by when storms form, which usually is around peak heating during the mid-to-late afternoon but on some days occurs in early afternoon or even in the morning. An additional advantage of later season storms is that days are considerably longer than in early spring. Morning or early afternoon storms tend to be associated with stronger wind shear and thus most often happen earlier in the spring season or later during the fall season.

Chasing efforts occur in the Top End of the Northern Territory and in southeastern Australia, with the biggest successes in November and December. A handful of individuals are also known to be chasing in other countries, including the United Kingdom, Israel, Italy, Spain, France, Belgium, the Netherlands, Finland, Germany, Austria, Switzerland, Poland, Bulgaria, Slovenia, Hungary, the Czech Republic, Slovakia, Estonia, Argentina, Brazil, Paraguay, South Africa, Bangladesh, and New Zealand; although many people trek to the Great Plains of North America from these and other countries around the world (especially from the UK). The number of chasers and number countries where chasers are active expanded at an accelerating pace in Europe from the 1990s–2010s and in the Pampas and surrounding areas of South America in the 2010s-2020s.

== Dangers ==
There are inherent dangers involved in pursuing hazardous weather. These range from lightning, tornadoes, large hail, flooding, hazardous road conditions (rain or hail-covered roadways), animals on the roadway, downed power lines (and occasionally other debris), reduced visibility from heavy rain (often wind blown), blowing dust, hail and hail fog. Most directly weather-related hazards such as from a tornado are minimized if the storm chaser is knowledgeable and cautious. In some situations severe downburst winds may push automobiles around, especially high-profile vehicles. Tornadoes affect a relatively small area and are predictable enough to be avoided if sustaining situational awareness and following strategies including always having an open escape route, maintaining a safe distance, and avoiding placement in the direction of travel of a tornado (in most cases in the Northern Hemisphere this is to the north and to the east of a tornado). Lightning, however, is an unavoidable hazard.

"Core punching", storm chaser slang for driving through a heavy precipitation core to intercept the area of interest within a storm, is recognized as hazardous due to reduced visibility and because many tornadoes are rain-wrapped. Upon leaving the heavy precipitation, chasers enter the "notch," or the area between the precipitation and the possibly rain wrapped tornado. It is often clear as the intense updraft doesn't allow precipitation to fall to the ground, allowing for possibly exceptional views of the tornado, but is extremely dangerous as it offers few escape routes and makes chasers vulnerable to deviant motion. Driving further, chasers can enter the "bear's cage," which refers to the area under a rotating wall cloud (and any attendant tornadoes), which is the "bear", and to the blinding precipitation (which can include window-shatteringly large hail) surrounding some or all sides of a rain-wrapped tornado, which is the "cage".

Similarly, chasing at night heightens risk due to darkness.

In reality, the most significant hazard is driving, which is made more dangerous by the severe weather. Adding still more to this hazard are the multiple distractions which can compete for a chaser's attention, such as driving, communicating with chase partners and others with a phone and/or radio, navigating, watching the sky, checking weather data, and shooting photos or video. Prudence and defensive driving is key to minimizing the risk. Chasers ideally work to prevent the driver from multitasking either by chase partners covering the other aspects or by the driver pulling over to do these other things if they are chasing alone. Drowsy driving is a chase hazard, especially on long trips back. This is exacerbated by nocturnal darkness and by the defatigating demands of driving through precipitation and on slick roads.

=== Incidents ===
For nearly sixty years, the only known chaser deaths were driving-related. As of 25 December 2025, there are four known direct storm chasing deaths and twelve indirect deaths. Nearly half of the indirect deaths are a result of hydroplaning in conditions after a chase.

The first was Christopher Phillips, a University of Oklahoma (OU) undergraduate student, who died in a hydroplaning accident when swerving to miss a rabbit in 1984. Other incidents included Jeff Wear driving home in East Texas from a Hurricane Dennis chase in 2005, and Fabian Guerra swerving to miss a deer while driving to a chase on I-80 in Iowa in 2009. A wrong-way driver resulted in a head-on collision that killed Andy Gabrielson who was on the Turner Turnpike (I-44) near Sapulpa, Oklahoma, returning to Luverne, Minnesota, from a chase in 2012.

On 31 May 2013, an extreme event led to the first known chaser deaths inflicted directly by weather when the widest tornado ever recorded struck near El Reno, Oklahoma. Engineer Tim Samaras, his photographer son Paul, and meteorologist Carl Young were killed on a rural road by the tornado while doing in situ probe and infrasonic field research. An amateur storm chaser was also killed in the tornado in a separate vehicle. In an exceptional combination of events, the already large and rain-obscured yet partially translucent tornado swiftly swelled to 2.6 mi (4.2 km) wide as it simultaneously changed direction and accelerated. Several other chasers were also struck and some injured by this tornado and its parent supercell's rear flank downdraft (RFD).

While chasing severe storms, a vehicle driven by Randall Yarnall for Kelley Williamson, who were contracting for The Weather Channel (TWC) as stars of their own show, Storm Wranglers, ran a stop sign while northbound on Farm to Market Road 1081 and struck a vehicle driven by Corbin Lee Jaeger going west on Farm to Market Road 2794 in West Texas in 2017. All three died at the scene, and the mother of Jaeger sued the estates of Williamson and Yarnall, as well as TWC, as there was a history of reckless driving by the pair for which it was alleged TWC ignored warnings to them by other chasers. The suit filed in 2019 was resolved in 2021.

On May 28, 2019, a storm touring operator, known as Silver Lining Tours, was involved in an incident with a heavily rainwrapped tornado near Overbrook, Kansas. A dozen people were injured, though no deaths were reported as two of the vans were tossed by the unseen tornado into a field.

Another fatality occurred in 2019 when Dale Sharpe, an Australian, struck a deer and subsequently became disabled on Kansas Highway 42. As he fled the vehicle, an oncoming vehicle struck him and he later died at the hospital.

Two separate fatal accidents occurred in 2022. In April three OU meteorology students, Drake Brooks, Nicholas Nair, and Gavin Short, died after hydroplaning on I-35 in Oklahoma while returning from a chase and in May, Martha Llanos Rodriguez, a storm chasing meteorologist from Mexico City was killed and three meteorologist colleagues were injured (two Chileans sustained non-life-threatening injuries and the other, Bradford Barrett, an American stationed in Chile, sustained life-threatening injuries) when they stopped for downed power lines on I-90 in southwestern Minnesota and their vehicle was hit by a semi-trailer truck.

There are other incidents in which chasers were injured by automobile accidents, lightning strikes, and tornado impacts. While chasing a tornado outbreak on 13 March 1990, KWTV television photographer Bill Merickel was shot and injured upon accidentally stumbling on a drug deal near Lindsay, Oklahoma.

== Equipment ==
Storm chasers vary with regards to the amount of equipment used, some prefer a minimalist approach; for example, where only basic photographic equipment is taken on a chase, while others use everything from satellite-based tracking systems and live data feeds to vehicle-mounted weather stations and hail guards.

=== Historic ===
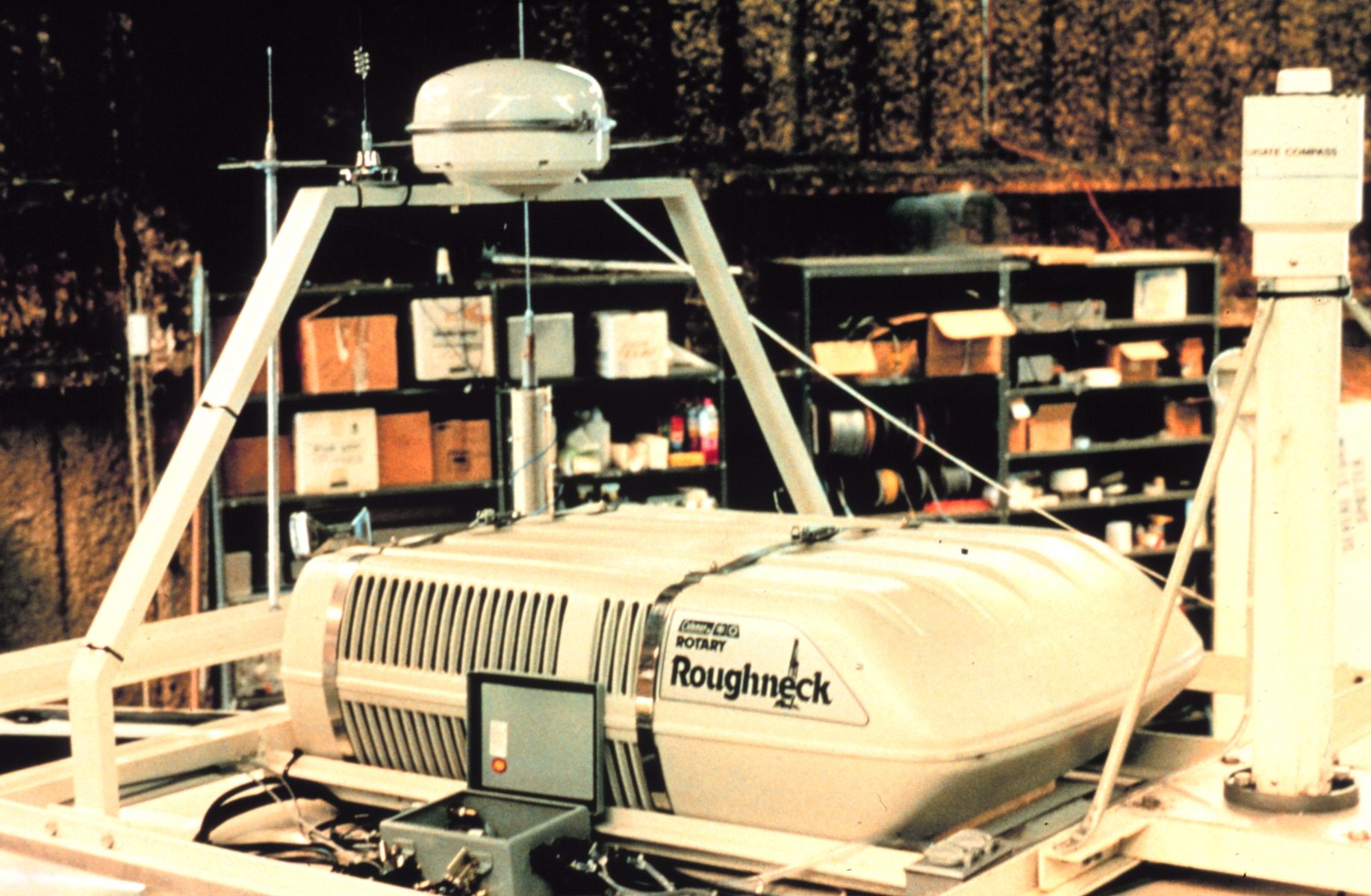
Top of a NSSL chase vehicle showing air conditioning unit, compass, and Global Positioning System.

Historically, storm chasing relied on either in-field analysis or in some cases nowcasts from trained observers and forecasters. The first in-field technology consisted of radio gear for communication. Much of this equipment could also be adapted to receive radiofax data which was useful for receiving basic observational and analysis data. The primary users of such technology were university or government research groups who often had larger budgets than individual chasers.

Radio scanners were also heavily used to listen in on emergency services and storm spotters so as to determine where the most active or dangerous weather was located. A number of chasers were also radio amateurs, and used mobile (or portable) amateur radio to communicate directly with spotters and other chasers, allowing them to keep abreast of what they could not themselves see.

It was not until the mid- to late 1980s that the evolution of the laptop computer would begin to revolutionize storm chasing. Early on, some chasers carried acoustic couplers to download batches of raw surface and upper air data from payphones. The technology was too slow for graphical imagery such as radar and satellite data; and during the first years this wasn't available on any connection over telephone lines, anyway. Some raw data could be downloaded and plotted by software, such as surface weather observations using WeatherGraphix (predecessor to Digital Atmosphere) and similar software or for upper air soundings using SHARP, RAOB, and similar software.

Most meteorological data was acquired all at once early in the morning, and the rest of day's chasing was based on analysis and forecast gleaned from this; as well as on visual clues that presented themselves in the field throughout the day. Plotted weather maps were often analyzed by hand for manual diagnosis of meteorological patterns.

When available chasers would make stops at rural airstrips or NWS offices for an update on weather conditions. NOAA Weather Radio (NWR) could provide information in the vehicle, without stopping, such as weather watches and warnings, surface weather conditions, convective outlooks, and NWS radar summaries. Nowadays, storm chasers may use high-speed Internet access available in any library, even in small towns in the US. This data is available throughout the day, but one must find and stop at a location offering Internet access.

With the development of the mobile computers, the first computer mapping software became feasible, at about the same time as the popular adoption of the VHS camcorder began a rapid growth phase. Prior to the mid to late 1980s most motion picture equipment consisted of 8 mm film cameras. While the quality of the first VHS consumer cameras was quite poor (and the size somewhat cumbersome) when compared to traditional film formats, the amount of video which could be shot with a minimal amount of resources was much greater than any film format at the time.

In the 1980s and 1990s The Weather Channel (TWC) and A.M. Weather were popular with chasers, in the morning preceding a chase for the latter and both before and during a chase for the former. Commercial radio sometimes also provides weather and damage information. The 1990s brought technological leaps and bounds. With the swift development of solid state technology, television sets for example could be installed with ease in most vehicles allowing storm chasers to actively view local TV stations.

Mobile phones became popular making group coordination easier when traditional radio communications methods were not ideal or for those possessing radios. The development of the World Wide Web (WWW) in 1993 hastened adoption of the Internet and led to FTP access to some of the first university weather sites.

The mid-1990s marked the development of smaller more efficient marine radars. While such marine radars are illegal if used in land-mobile situations, a number of chasers were quick to adopt them in an effort to have mobile radar. These radars have been found to interfere with research radars, such as the Doppler on Wheels (DOW) utilized in field projects. The first personal lightning detection and mapping devices also became available and the first online radar data was offered by private corporations or, at first with delays, with free services. A popular data vendor by the end of the 1990s was WeatherTAP.

=== Current ===
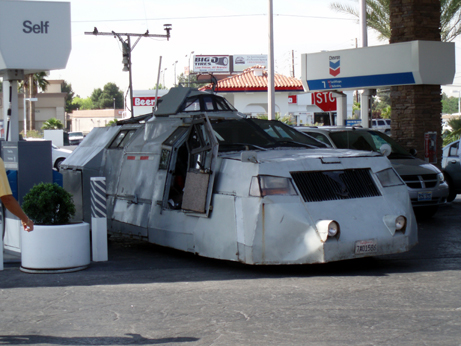
An armored "Tornado Intercept Vehicle" used to film inside a tornado with an IMAX camera, and featured in the Discovery Channel series, Storm Chasers.

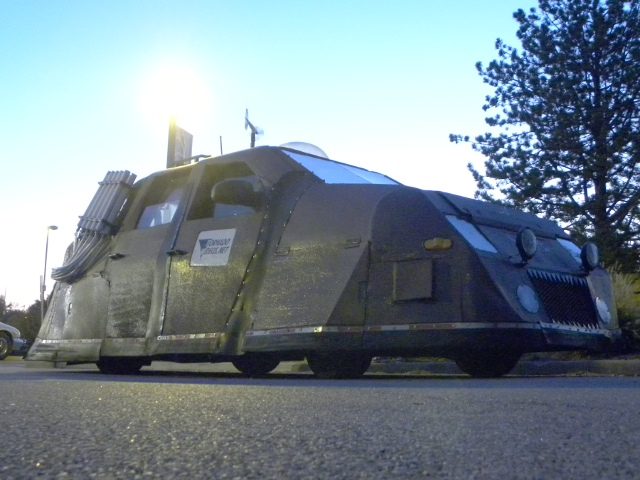
The SRV Dominator, an armored tornado intercept vehicle featured in the Discovery Channel series, Storm Chasers.

Chasers used paper maps for navigation and some of those now using GPS still use these as a backup or for strategizing with other chasers. Foldable state maps can be used but are cumbersome due to the multitude of states needed and only show major roads. National atlases allow more detail and all states are contained in a single book, with AAA favored and Rand McNally followed by Michelin also used. The preferred atlases due to great detail in rural areas are the "Roads of..." series originally by Shearer Publishing, which first included Texas but expanded to other states such as Oklahoma and Colorado. Covering every state of the union are the DeLorme "Atlas and Gazetteer" series.

DeLorme also produced early GPS receivers that connected to laptops and for years was one of two major mapping software creators. DeLorme Street Atlas USA or Microsoft Streets & Trips were used by most chasers until their discontinuations in 2013. Chasers now use Google Maps, Waze, and/or Apple Maps or other web mapping on mobile devices as no comparably robust mapping software emerged although operating systems later implemented the apps Windows Maps and Apple Maps. To ensure mapping availability without an active internet connection, these solutions all require downloading maps locally ahead of time. GPS receivers may still be used with other software, such as for displaying radar data.

A major turning point was the advent of civilian GPS in 1996, which was followed by additional satellite navigation systems in ensuing decades and by refinements of GPS. At first, GPS units were very costly and only offered basic functions, but that would soon change. Towards the late 1990s the Internet was awash in weather data and free weather software, the first true cellular Internet modems for consumer use also emerged providing chasers access to data in the field without having to rely on a nowcaster. The NWS also released the first free, up-to-date NEXRAD Level 3 radar data. In conjunction with all of this, GPS units now had the ability to connect with computers, granting greater ease when navigating.

2001 marked the next great technological leap for storm chasers as the first Wi-Fi units began to emerge offering wireless broadband service in many cases for free. Some places (restaurants, motels, libraries, etc.) were known to reliably offer wireless access and wardriving located other availabilities. In 2002 the first Windows-based package to combine GPS positioning and Doppler weather radar appeared called SWIFT WX. SWIFT WX allowed storm chasers to seamlessly position themselves accurately relative to tornadic storms.

In 2004 two more storm chaser tools emerged. The first, WxWorx, was a new XM Satellite Radio based system utilizing a special receiver and Baron Services weather software. Unlike preexisting cellular based services there was no risk of dead spots, and that meant that even in the most remote areas storm chasers still had a live data feed. The second tool was a new piece of software called GRLevel3. GRLevel3 and the higher bandwidth consuming GR2Analyst from the GRLevelX suite utilize both free and subscription based raw radar files, displaying the data in a true vector format with GIS layering abilities. Since 2006 a growing number of chasers are using Spotter Network (SN), which uses GPS data to plot real time position of participating spotters and chasers, and allows observers to report significant weather as well as GIS layering for navigation maps, weather products, and the like.

The most common chaser communications device is the cellular phone. These are used for both voice and data connections. External antennas and amplifiers may be used to boost signal transception. It is not uncommon that chasers travel in small groups of cars, and they may use CB radio (declining in use) or inexpensive GMRS / FRS hand-held transceivers for inter-vehicle communication. More commonly, many chasers are also ham radio operators and use the 2 meters VHF and, less often, 70 cm UHF bands to communicate between vehicles or with Skywarn / Canwarn spotter networks. Scanners are often used to monitor spotter, sometimes public safety communications, and can double as weather radios.

Since the mid-2000s social networking services may also be used, with Twitter most used for ongoing events, Facebook for sharing images and discussing chase reports, Discord for the same and with forecast conversations occurring on both platforms, with YouTube and sometimes Vimeo or TikTok for sharing videos, and Instagram also used to share imagery. Social networking services largely (but not completely) replace forums and email lists, which complemented and eventually supplanted Storm Track magazine, for conversing about and sharing images of storms.

In-field environmental data is still popular among some storm chasers, especially temperature, moisture, and wind speed and direction data. Many choose to mount weather stations atop their vehicles. Even professionally installed and scientific grade instrument systems are subject to various problems, however, so such casually collected data must be considered tenuously. Others use handheld anemometers. Rulers or baseballs may be brought along for measuring hail and for showing as a comparison object. Vehicle mounted cameras, such as on the roof or more commonly on the dash, provide continuous visual recording capability.

Chasers heavily utilized still photography since the beginning. Videography gained prominence by the 1990s into the early 2000s but a resurgence of photography occurred with the advent of affordable and versatile digital SLR (DSLR) cameras. Prior to this, 35 mm SLR print and slide film formats were mostly used, along with some medium format cameras. In the late 2000s, mobile phone 3G data networks became fast enough to allow live streaming video from chasers using webcams. This live imagery is frequently used by the media, as well as NWS meteorologists, emergency managers, and the general public for direct ground truth information, and it promotes video sales opportunities for chasers. Also by this time, camcorders using memory cards to record video began to be adopted. Digital video had been around for years but was recorded on tape, whereas solid-state is random access rather than sequential access (linear) and has no moving parts. Late in the 2000s HD video began to overtake SD (which had been NTSC in North America) in usage as prices came down and performance increased (initially there were low-light and sporadic aliasing problems due to chip and sensor limitations). By the mid-2010s 4K cameras were increasingly in use.

Tripods and other camera mounting devices are used by those seeking crisp professional photo and video imagery and also enable chasers to tend to other activities. Other accessories include cable/remote shutter releases, lightning triggers, and lens filters. Windshield mounted cameras or dome enclosed cameras atop vehicle roofs may also be used, and a few chasers use UASs ("drones").

Late in the 2000s smartphones increased in usage, with radar viewing applications frequently used. Particularly, RadarScope on the iOS and Android platforms is favored. Pkyl3 was a dominant early choice on Android devices but which discontinued development in August 2018. RadarOmega became a commonly used app in the 2020s. Other apps may be used as are browsers for viewing meteorological data and accessing social networking services.

Some handsets can be used as WiFi hotspots and wireless cards may also be used to avoid committing a handset to tethering or operating as a hotspot. Some hotspots operate as mobile broadband MNVO devices using any radio spectrum that is both available and is in contract with a service provider. Such devices may expand mobile data range beyond a single carrier's service area and typically can work on month-to-month contracts. Adoption of tablet computers expanded by the early 2010s. 4G LTE was adopted early, when available, and was especially useful for uploading HD video. 5G is used with some chasers selecting carriers based on network coverage. Connected car technology includes Wi-Fi which can be used to augment, or even supplant, connectivity via mobile phones.

A gradual uptick of those selecting mirrorless interchangeable-lens cameras (MILCs) began in the mid-2010s. Usage of DSLR for video capture, called HDSLR, is common, although camcorders remain relatively popular due to their greater functionality (many chasers still shoot both). Through the 2020s the use of 8K devices is gradually expanding and by the mid-2020s a few chasers are experimenting with 360-degree video.

Chasers also carry common travel articles and vehicle maintenance items, and sometimes first aid kits. Full sized spare tires are strongly preferable to "donut" emergency replacement tires. Power inverters (often with surged protected power strips) power devices that require AC (indoor/wall outlet) power, although some devices may be powered directly with DC (battery power) from the vehicle electric system. Water repellent products, such as Rain-X or Aquapel, are frequently applied to windshields to dispel water when driving as well as mud and small detritus, which boosts visibility and image clarity on photographs and videos shot through glass (which is particularly problematic if autofocus is on). Binoculars and sunglasses may be employed.

== Ethics ==
A growing number of experienced storm chasers advocate the adoption of a code of ethics in storm chasing featuring safety, courtesy, and objectivity as the backbone. Storm chasing is a highly visible recreational activity (which is also associated with science) that is vulnerable to sensationalist media promotion. Veteran storm chasers Chuck Doswell and Roger Edwards deemed reckless storm chasers as "yahoos". Doswell and Edwards believe poor chasing ethics at TV news stations add to the growth of "yahoo" storm chasing.

A large lawsuit was filed against the parent company of The Weather Channel in March 2019 for allegedly keeping on contract storm chaser drivers with a demonstrated pattern of reckless driving which ultimately led to a fatal collision (killing themselves and a storm spotter in the other vehicle) when running a stop sign in Texas in 2017. Edwards and Rich Thompson, among others, also expressed concern about pernicious effects of media profiteering with Matt Crowther, among others, agreeing in principle but viewing sales as not inherently corrupting.

Self-policing is predominantly seen as the means to mold the hobby. There is occasional discussion among chasers that at some point government regulation may be imposed due to increasing numbers of chasers and because of poor behavior by some individuals; however, many chasers do not expect this eventuality and almost all oppose regulations—as do some formal studies of dangerous leisure activities which also advocate deliberative self-policing.

As there is for storm chaser conduct, there is concern about chaser responsibility. Since some chasers are trained in first aid and even first responder procedures, it is not uncommon for tornado chasers to be first on a scene and tending to storm victims or treating injuries at the site of a disaster in advance of emergency personnel and other outside aid.

Aside from questions concerning their ethical values and conduct, many have been credited with giving back to the community in several ways. Just before the Joplin tornado, Storm Chaser Jeff Piotrowski provided advanced warning to Officer Brewer of Joplin local law enforcement, prompting them to activate the emergency sirens. Though lives were lost, many who survived credited their survival to the siren. After a storm has passed storm chasers are often the first to arrive on the scene and sometimes help assist.

Occasionally chasers provide data for research from their videos, social video posts, and documentation of storms. After the El Reno tornado in 2013, portals were created for chasers to submit their information to help in the research of the deadly storm. The El Reno Tornado Environment Display (TED) was created to show a synchronized view of the submitted video footage overlaying radar images of the storm with various chasers' positions. Chasers sometimes contribute to assessments of tornado damage, occasionally conducting their own surveys or collaborating with officials, especially as use of UASs grows. The OTUS Project, in collaboration with researchers, uses hardened custom UASs operated by a head-mounted display to record video and meteorological data, emphasizing wind field and thermodynamic documentation, in the vicinity and interior of tornadoes.

== In popular culture ==
- Twister, a 1996 film starring Helen Hunt and Bill Paxton
- Into the Storm, a 2014 film
- Heavy Weather, a 1994 novel
- Storm Chasers, a 2007–2011 reality TV series
- Nancy Drew: Trail of the Twister, a 2010 video game and 22nd installment in the Nancy Drew game series by Her Interactive
- Twisters, a 2024 film and sequel to the 1996 film starring Daisy Edgar-Jones and Glen Powell

== See also ==
- 53rd Weather Reconnaissance Squadron
- Eclipse chasing
- Landscape photography
- Hurricane hunters (crews)
- NOAA Hurricane Hunters (aircraft)
- Weather spotting
