= Neil B. Ward =

American meteorologist

Neil Ward
- Born: June 26, 1914; Purcell, Oklahoma, United States
- Died: April 12, 1972 (aged 57); Norman, Oklahoma, United States
- Education: University of Oklahoma; Texas A&M University
- Known for: Physical modeling of tornadoes First scientific storm chaser
- Scientific career
- Fields: Physics, meteorology
- Workplaces: Weather Bureau; National Severe Storms Laboratory

Neil Burgher Ward (June 26, 1914 – April 12, 1972) was an American meteorologist who is credited as the first scientific storm chaser, developing ideas of thunderstorm and tornado structure and evolution as well as techniques for forecasting and severe weather intercept. He also was a pioneering developer of physical models of tornadoes, first at his home, then at the National Severe Storms Laboratory (NSSL) in Norman, Oklahoma. He significantly furthered the modern scientific understanding of atmospheric vortices, particularly tornadoes.

== Biography ==
Ward first studied mechanical engineering at the University of Oklahoma (OU). In 1939, he began working for the Weather Bureau as a weather observer, eventually becoming a forecaster. Earning two scholarships, he attended graduate school at Texas A&M University, the University of Oklahoma, and Colorado State University (CSU), beginning in late 1956. He studied fluid mechanics and developed an increasing interest in atmospheric vortices by the early 1950s. Neil was a research scientist at NSSL from the first year of its operation in 1964 until his death in 1972. He began actively pursuing storms on the road in 1961, coordinating with radar information via the Oklahoma Highway Patrol radio.

== See also ==
- Ted Fujita
- David K. Hoadley
