= Tornado Alley =

Geographical place in which tornadoes commonly occur

Coordinates: 35°N 88°W

A diagram of Tornado Alley based on one tornado or more per decade. Rough location (red), and its contributing weather systems

Tornado Alley, also known as Tornado Valley, is a loosely defined location of the central United States where tornadoes are most frequent. The term was first used in 1952 as the title of a research project to study severe weather in portions of Texas, Louisiana, Oklahoma, Kansas, South Dakota, Iowa and Nebraska. Tornado climatologists distinguish peaks in activity in certain areas, and storm chasers have long recognized the Great Plains tornado belt.

The term is colloquial; there are no definitively set boundaries of Tornado Alley. The area common to most definitions extends from Arkansas, Illinois, Indiana, Iowa, Kansas, Minnesota, Missouri, Montana, Nebraska, North Dakota, Ohio, Oklahoma, South Dakota, Texas, Wisconsin, and eastern portions of Colorado, New Mexico and Wyoming. Research suggests that the main alley may be shifting eastward away from the Great Plains. Tornadoes are also becoming more frequent in the northern and eastern parts of Tornado Alley, reaching the Canadian Prairies, Ohio, Michigan, and Southern Ontario.

== Geographical area ==
Tornado activity in the United States (1950-2006)

Over the years, the location(s) of Tornado Alley have not been clearly defined. No definition of tornado alley has ever been officially designated by the National Weather Service (NWS). Thus, differences in location are the result of the different criteria used.

According to the National Severe Storms Laboratory (NSSL) FAQ, "Tornado Alley" is a term used by the media as a reference to areas that have higher numbers of tornadoes. A study of 1921–1995 tornadoes concluded almost one-fourth of all significant tornadoes occur in Tornado Alley.

Illinois, Wisconsin, Minnesota, Indiana, Michigan, and western Ohio, are sometimes included in Tornado Alley. Some research suggests that tornadoes are becoming more frequent in the northern parts of Tornado Alley where it reaches the Canadian Prairies.

Tornadoes occur most frequently in the United States, particularly in the Central states, between the Rocky Mountains to the west and Appalachian Mountains to the east. Texas has the most overall number of tornadoes of any state. Per data collected through 2007, Kansas and Oklahoma ranked first and second respectively in the number of tornadoes per area. However, in 2013 statistics from the National Climatic Data Center reported Florida ranked first in tornadoes per area, although Florida is not a part of Tornado Alley. Florida's high ranking on the tornado list also has to do with the fact that the state sees a high number of waterspouts, small tornadoes that form over water. Although strong land-tornadoes have hit Florida, and while reports show Florida has a very high number of overall tornadoes, the tornadoes in the state seldom reach the velocity of those that may occur in the Southern Plains. In the United States, tornadoes typically occur in late spring and early summer during the changing season patterns as a warm air mass typically collides with a cold air mass resulting in tornadoes.

Another criterion for the location of Tornado Alley can be where the strongest tornadoes occur more frequently.

Tornado Alley can also be defined as an area reaching from central Texas to the Canadian Prairies and from eastern Colorado to western Ohio.

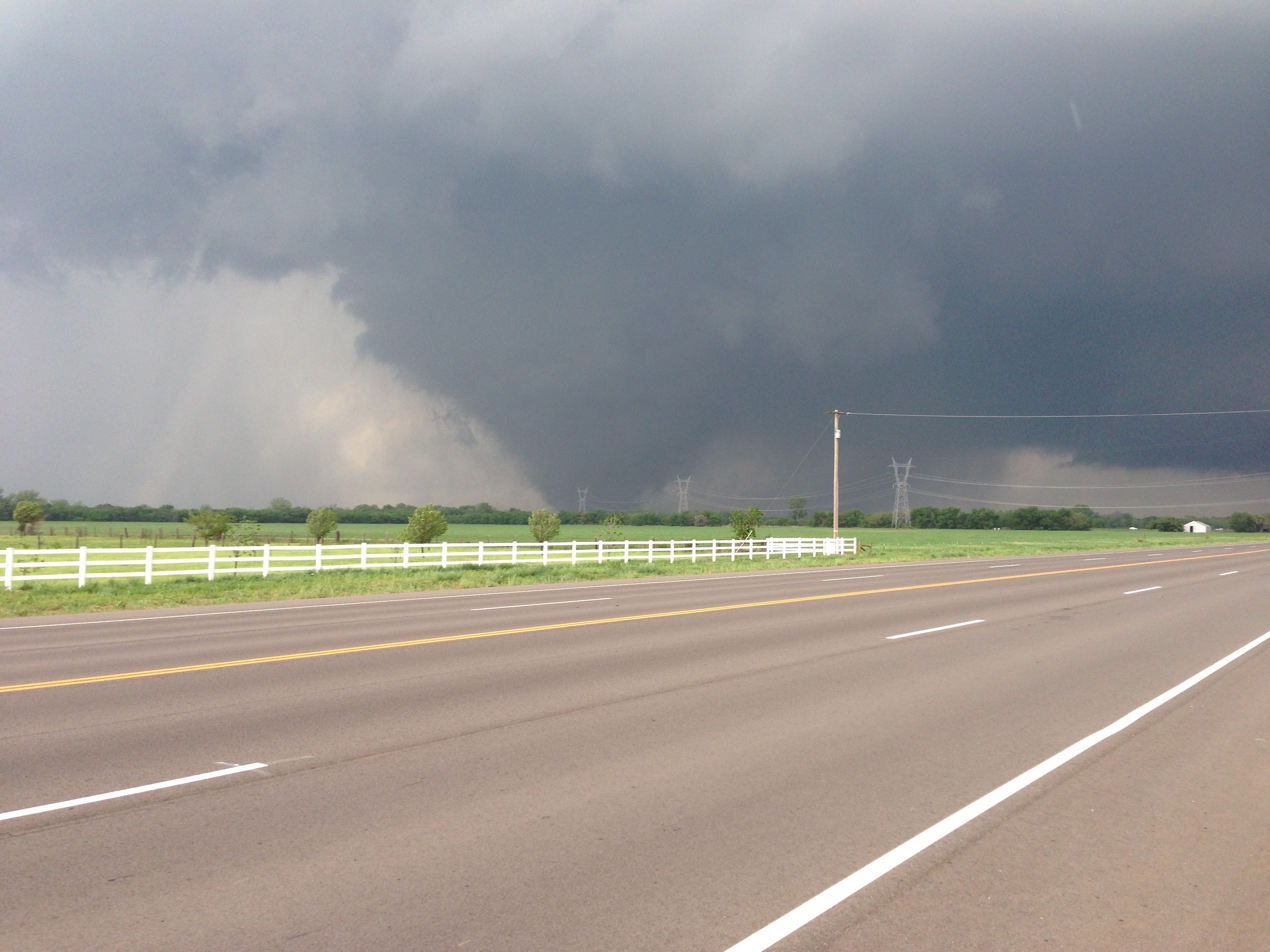
The 2013 Moore tornado, an EF5 tornado, formed in Oklahoma, which is located in Tornado Alley

Some researchers argue that there are several Tornado Alleys. In addition to the Texas/Oklahoma/Kansas core, such other areas include the Upper Midwest, the lower Ohio Valley, the Tennessee Valley, and the lower Mississippi valley, which may have respective distinguishing characteristics. A coherent conception considers that there is a single Tornado Alley in the United States and Canada, and that this can simply be subdivided into smaller areas based on regional attributes.

The extension of the North American tornadically active in the southeastern U.S., notably the lower Mississippi Valley and the upper Tennessee Valley, are sometimes called by the nickname "Dixie Alley", coined in 1971 by Allen Pearson, former director of the National Severe Storms Forecast Center (NSSFC). A 2018 study found in the U.S., over the study period 1979–2017, an overall eastward shift of tornado frequency and impacts - toward Dixie Alley. The study found, since 1979, relatively-lower tornado frequency and impacts in parts of the traditional Tornado Alley, especially areas from north-central Texas toward the Houston, TX area, and relatively-higher tornado frequency and impacts in parts of the Mid-South, especially eastern Arkansas, the greater Memphis, TN area and northern Mississippi - all areas near the heart of Dixie Alley.

In Tornado Alley, warm, humid air from the equator meets cool to cold, dry air from Canada and the Rocky Mountains. This creates an ideal environment for tornadoes to form within developed thunderstorms and supercells.

== Origin of the term ==
The term "tornado alley" was first used in 1952 by U.S. Air Force meteorologists Major Ernest J. Fawbush (1915–1982) and Captain Robert C. Miller (1920–1998), as the title of a research project to study severe weather in parts of Texas and Oklahoma.

== Impact ==
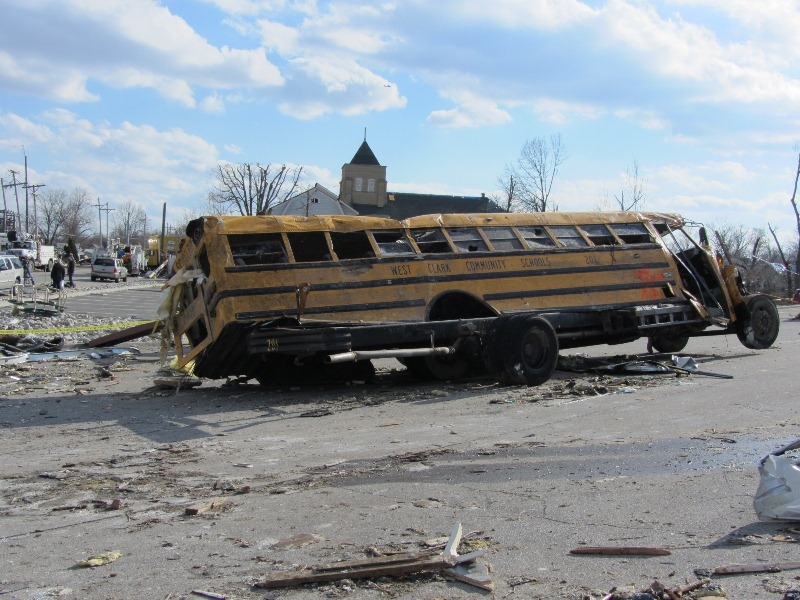
The destruction of a school bus after an outbreak in Tornado Alley

Despite the elevated frequency of destructive tornadoes, building codes, such as requiring strengthened roofs and more secure connections between the building and its foundation, are not necessarily stricter compared to other areas of the United States and are markedly weaker than some hurricane prone areas, such as south Florida. One particular tornado-afflicted town, Moore, Oklahoma, managed to increase its building requirements in 2014. Other common precautionary measures include the construction of storm cellars and the installation of tornado sirens. Tornado awareness, preparedness, and media weather coverage are also high.

The southeastern United States is particularly prone to violent, long track tornadoes. Much of the housing in this region is less robust compared to other areas in the United States, and many people live in mobile homes. As a result, tornado-related casualties in the southern United States are higher. Significant tornadoes occur less frequently than in the traditionally recognized tornado alley; however, very severe and expansive outbreaks occur every few years.

== Frequency of tornadoes ==
These figures, reported by the National Climatic Data Center for the period between 1991 and 2010, show the seventeen U.S. states with the highest average number of EF0-EF5 tornadoes per 10,000 square miles (25,899.9 km^{2}) per year.

1. Florida: 12.3
2. Kansas: 11.7
3. Maryland: 9.9
4. Illinois: 9.7
5. Mississippi: 9.2
6. Iowa: 9.1
7. Oklahoma: 9
8. South Carolina: 9
9. Alabama: 8.6
10. Louisiana: 8.5
11. Arkansas: 7.5
12. Nebraska: 7.4
13. Missouri: 6.5
14. North Carolina: 6.4
15. Tennessee: 6.2
16. Indiana: 6.1
17. Texas: 5.9

== Tornadoes in Canada ==
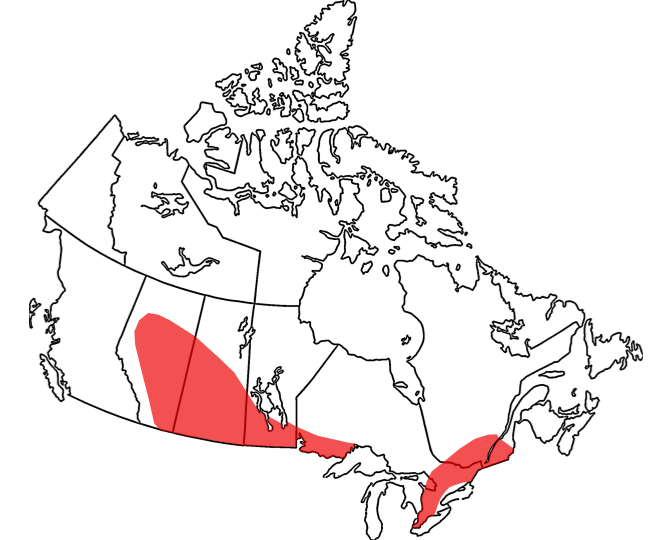
Canadian Tornado Alley

Canada records the second most tornadoes in the world after the United States. The average number of tornadoes per equal area of land is highest in the southern parts of Alberta, Saskatchewan, Manitoba, and Ontario.

Each year on average, about 43 tornadoes occur across the Canadian Prairies. The peak of the season is June through August. Together, this region makes up the northernmost border of the US Tornado Alley. Tornadoes up to EF5 in strength, such as 2007 Elie tornado have been documented in this region. In some summer months, Saskatchewan has recorded more tornadoes than the entire United States, such as in July 2012.

On average, another 17 tornadoes each year, or about a quarter of Canadian tornadoes strike Southern Ontario and Southern Quebec, especially in the region between the Great Lakes and the nation's capital city, Ottawa. Tornadoes do not often hit lake shadow regions, although they are not unknown, and some, such as the 2011 Goderich tornado, have been violent. However, most Ontario tornadoes are concentrated in a narrow corridor from Windsor to Ottawa as well as through portions of Central Quebec. Tornadoes up to F4 in strength have been documented in this region.

In more recent years, an emerging trend has suggested that the Ottawa Valley is seeing an increasing number of frequent and violent tornadoes. The 2018 National Capital Region Outbreak spawned a high-end EF3+ and high-end EF2 which caused catastrophic damage to areas in both Ottawa and Gatineau. 2023 saw 5 tornadoes of varying intensities strike the region, including two EF1 tornadoes which touched down in the Barrhaven suburb within minutes of one another. This phenomenon, while still in the preliminary stages of study, has led some to name this hotspot "Tornado Valley".

Southwestern Ontario weather is strongly influenced by its peninsular position between the Great Lakes. As a result, increases in temperature in this region are likely to increase the amount of precipitation in storms due to lake evaporation. Increased temperature contrasts may also increase the violence and possibly the number of tornadoes.

Northern Ontario between the Manitoba border and Lake Superior is also prone to severe tornadoes, but tornadoes in this area are believed to be underestimated due to the extremely low population in this region.

== See also ==
- Dixie Alley
- Flash Flood Alley
- Hailstorm Alley
- Lists of tornadoes and tornado outbreaks
- Tornado climatology
