= Spotter Network =

- Formation: April 2006
- Purpose: Severe weather spotting
- Region served: United States
- Members: Volunteer
- Official language: English
- Website: www.spotternetwork.org

The Spotter Network (SN) is a system that utilizes storm spotter and chaser reports of location and severe weather in a centralized framework for use by coordinators such as emergency managers, Skywarn and related spotter organizations, and the National Weather Service. It uses GPS to provide accurate and automated position data of storm spotters and chasers for coordination and reporting, which in turn provides ground truth to public servants engaged in the protection of life and property. The network is a combination of locally installed software for position and status reporting and web-based processing, mapping, and reporting.

The original Spotter Network was developed by Tyler Allison. The current president of the organization is John Wetter. It became operational in April 2006 and quickly grew to over 100 spotters. Several National Weather Service (NWS) employees and other officials soon took an interest in the capabilities it brings to them to integrate ground truth provided by spotters into their operational responsibilities. Subsequent versions of the network expanded the coordinator and reporting capabilities, and NWS eSpotter integration was completed in early September 2006.

Spotters must pass an online test of storm structure and basic meteorology in order to use the system. All reports are also reviewed for quality control purposes. Contact information is provided by users and can be controlled to reach the all users (the general public) or selectively to reach emergency managers and NWS officials. SN features GIS capabilities for use with external websites and apps.

Several papers have been written on the use of the Spotter Network in meteorological research and operations such as:

- Emerging Technologies in the Field to Improve Information in Support of Operations and Research
- The Digital Revolution of Storm Spotting Modernizations of Training, Tracking, and Reporting
- Enriching the Modern Day Storm Spotter Through Technology & Education Enhancements

The SN is officially a Minnesota non-profit corporation, and is recognized as a 501(c)(3) organization by the IRS and is run as an organization of like-minded individuals taking input from the various communities that it serves and making the output available to any and all who are interested in severe weather.

The SN has a Board of Directors and an advisory committee made up of professional meteorologists, storm spotters, storm chasers, emergency response personnel, and NWS officials.

On February 26, 2017, storm chasers paid respects to 'Twister' star Bill Paxton by arranging their position indicators to form the initials BP. A similar tribute was done in early June 2013 after the deaths of Tim Samaras, Paul Samaras, and Carl Young in a tornado of record width in Oklahoma on May 31. The initials TS, PS, and CY were spelled out by storm chasers across North Dakota, South Dakota, and Nebraska, respectively.

== See also ==
- Automatic Packet Reporting System (APRS)
- Community Collaborative Rain, Hail and Snow Network (CoCoRaHS)
- Radio Amateur Civil Emergency Service (RACES)
- Amateur Radio Emergency Service (ARES)
- Radio Emergency Associated Communication Teams (REACT)
