= Allen Pearson =

American meteorologist

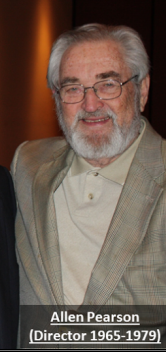
- Born: July 25, 1925; Mankato
- Died: August 11, 2016; Bossier City
- Education: University of California, Los Angeles, University of Hawaiʻi at Mānoa
- Occupation: Meteorologist
- Employers: Air National Guard; National Weather Service (1951–1981); Pan Am; United States Navy
- Awards: Department of Commerce Gold Medal

Allen Day Pearson (July 25, 1925–August 11, 2016) was the Director of the National Severe Storms Forecast Center from 1965 to 1979 and began to collaborate with Tetsuya Theodore "Ted" Fujita on tornado physical characteristics soon after the 1970 Lubbock Tornado. They bounced ideas off each other and the Fujita scale (F-scale) and later the FPP scale was the result. Pearson had devised the computerized encoding of the tornado base, which included the F-P-P estimates. Pearson's major role was to get the cooperation of the NWS State Climatologists and to extend the computerized data base backwards to the 1950s.

He was in the V-12 Navy College Training Program while at the University of Minnesota and the University of California, Los Angeles upon transferring there. Upon graduation, he was commissioned as an ensign. While in the Navy, he was an Aerology Officer and served in Manila, Philippines in 1946. He served in the Hawaii Air National Guard Weather Flight from 1952 to 1964 and the District of Columbia Air National Guard Weather Flight from 1964 to 1965, becoming the commanding officer of both units. He retired as a lieutenant colonel.

After his navy service, he then joined Pan American Airways as a meteorologist followed by the U.S. Weather Bureau (now NOAA) in 1951.

Pearson was awarded the Department of Commerce's gold medal in 1974 for "...forecasting of severe local storms...which included the Super Outbreak of April 3–4, 1974". Pearson successfully lobbied the United States Congress in the mid-1970s for satellite readout and computer equipment that the National Weather Service could not provide. This ultimately led to the sophisticated methodology in use today at the Storm Prediction Center in Norman, Oklahoma.

He retired from the National Weather Service in 1981, and lived in Shreveport, Louisiana. Pearson was born on July 28, 1925, in Mankato, Minnesota.

He graduated from Freeborn High School in 1943 and was the valedictorian. He held B.A.S. from University of California, Los Angeles in 1946 and a Master of Science from the University of Hawaiʻi at Mānoa in 1968. He died on August 11, 2016, in Bossier City, Louisiana, at the age of 91.
