= Hailstorm Alley =

Area of south and central Alberta, Canada

Hailstorm Alley is an area of south and central Alberta, Canada where hail storms are frequently produced. These storms frequently produce hail that is damaging to property. This area stretches from High River in southern Alberta, northward through Calgary, through Red Deer to Lacombe sometimes as far north as Edmonton and then westward to Rocky Mountain House. It is known to be one of the worst areas in the world for damaging hail produced by thunderstorms. These are regarded as loose boundaries. While this area is common for damaging hailstorms, the reality is damaging hailstorms occur over much of central and southern Alberta every summer. The City of Calgary is regarded as the hailstorm capital of Canada.

== Examples of previous storms ==
- On July 31, 1987, 12–15cm hailstones caused an unknown amount of damage in Spruce Grove and Edmonton, the "Black Friday" Edmonton F4 tornado was also produced on this day.
- In 1991, the City of Calgary experienced a storm that caused $342 million in damages. At the time, it was the most damaging hail storm in Canadian history.
- On July 11, 2004, an unknown amount of damage occurred in Edmonton from hail the size of golf balls to baseballs.
- On 12 July 2010, the City of Calgary experienced a storm that produced four-centimeter wide hailstones. This storm caused $400 million in damages, beating the previous record.
- In August 2014, Hailstorm Alley experienced numerous severe storms that cost $450 million in insured damages. These storms were recorded in Calgary, Airdrie, Red Deer and Rocky Mountain House.
- On June 30, 2016, a damaging storm hit the central Alberta town of Ponoka, causing $50 million in damages. This storm produced large hail as well as a tornado.
- In May 2017, a damaging storm hit the central Alberta city of Lacombe, causing $68 million in damages.
- On July 2018, severe storms hit central Alberta, resulting in $80 million in damages.
- On August 2, 2019, a supercell tracking over Edmonton, dumped large hail over the city resulting in $89 million in damages.
- On June 13, 2020, a severe storm hit the Cities of Calgary and Airdrie causing extensive damage and flash flooding. The damages have been calculated at around $1.5 billion, making this the 4th costliest natural disaster in Canadian history.
- On August 1, 2022, a destructive hail storm tore across central Alberta, including hail up to the size of softballs. People driving on Highway 2 between Innisfail and Penhold saw total destruction to their cars, with the RCMP stating that there were 70 cars on both sides of the highway with shattered windshields and windows. Hailstones over 100 mm in size were recorded, with Canada’s new largest hailstone being recorded with a width of 123 mm and a weight of 292.71 g.
- On August 5, 2024, a Calgary hailstorm occurred, which became the 2nd-costliest disaster in Canadian history after it caused $2.8 billion in damage.

== Cloud seeding and insurers ==
In 1996, insurance companies formed the Alberta Severe Weather Management Society and began the Alberta Hail Suppression Project. This project uses cloud seeding techniques to lessen the severity of hail storms. This society had budgeted $2.5 million in 2012 to run the suppression project, with the potential to save insurers many times this amount during one single storm by reducing claims. Cloud seeding has never been statistically proven to work.

== See also ==
- Tornado Alley
