= Weatherwise =

American magazine

- Editor-in-Chief: Margaret Benner Smidt
- Categories: Science, Weather
- Frequency: Bi-monthly (6 times a year)
- Circulation: 8,000
- Publisher: Taylor & Francis Group
- Founder: David M. Ludlum
- Founded: 1947; 79 years ago
- Country: United States
- Based in: Philadelphia, PA
- Language: English
- Website: www.weatherwise.org
- ISSN: 0043-1672

Weatherwise is a magazine founded in 1947 by American historian, meteorologist, and author David M. Ludlum. It covers weather and climate for weather enthusiasts as well as meteorologists and climatologists and is the only popular press publication in the United States to do so.

It is richly illustrated with large color photographs that showcase the power, beauty and excitement of weather. Articles are published on the latest discoveries and topics in meteorology, usually using experts in the respective field to write the article. Articles tend to focus on the relation of weather to technology, history, culture, the arts, and society. The magazine releases an annual almanac to highlight key topics that happened internationally, in the U.S. and corresponding hurricane and tornado seasons. The magazine also features commentaries, photography contests, questions and answers, and weather maps.

== Publication history ==
Weatherwise was published by Heldref Publications, the publishing division of the Helen Dwight Reid Education Foundation, a nonprofit educational organization based in Washington DC. In 2009, Heldref Publications (and Weatherwise) was acquired by Taylor & Francis Group.
