= List of University of Texas at Arlington people =

This is a list of notable people affiliated with the University of Texas at Arlington. Since its inception, the university has produced over 200,000 alumni, with approximately 130,000 living in the North Texas region.

== Notable UTA alumni ==
=== Arts and culture ===
==== Acting and drama ====
- Charles Baker - actor portraying the character Skinny Pete on Breaking Bad
- Annie Ilonzeh - actress, General Hospital and the short-lived ABC reboot of Charlie's Angels
- Kristi Kang - voice actress affiliated with Funimation
- Lauren Lane - actress, The Nanny
- Lou Diamond Phillips - actor, Golden Globe nominee
- Morgan Woodward - actor, Golden Boot Award winner for work in Western television and movie genre

==== Cinema ====
- Martin Lisius (BA '86 Communication) - filmmaker, storm chaser, founder of StormStock and Tempest Tours, chairman at TESSA

==== Literature ====
- Craig Lancaster - novelist

==== Music ====
- The 440 Alliance - cello rock group, founding members Drew Johnson, Brandon Vanderford, Andrew Walton, Nathan Keefer, and Neil Fong Gilfillan
- Mitch Grassi - singer, songwriter, YouTube personality with Scott Hoying on Superfruit, and member of the band Pentatonix
- Ray Price - country and western singer, songwriter, guitarist, and Country Music Hall of Fame inductee
- Gene Summers - singer, songwriter, musician, and international recording star; inducted into the Rockabilly Hall of Fame in 1997

==== Photography ====
- Brad Loper - Pulitzer Prize-winning photographer
- Jennifer Thoreson - contemporary artist

=== Business ===
- Pat Choate - economist, author, and vice-presidential candidate
- Roland Fryer (BS '98) - economist, youngest tenured African-American professor in Harvard University's history; named on Time Magazine's 2009 100 List
- Roger Krone (MS '81 Aerospace Engineering) - CEO of Leidos
- Kelcy Warren (BS '78 Civil Engineering) - chairman and CEO of Energy Transfer Partners; 143rd richest American in 2013
- Jim Wilkinson (BBA '93) - managing partner, International Business and Finance, Brunswick Group; former chief of staff for Treasury Secretary Henry Paulson

=== Engineering ===
- Kalpana Chawla - former NASA astronaut, died in the Space Shuttle Columbia disaster
- Wendy Okolo - NASA engineer
- Robert L. Stewart - former NASA astronaut and retired Army brigadier general

=== Government and military ===
- Richard E. Cavazos - first Mexican American four-star general of the United States Army
- Tommy Franks - US Army general and commander-in-chief of the U.S. Central Command 2000–2003
- Michael Langley - first Black four-star general of the United States Marine Corps

=== Politics ===
- Rodney Anderson (BBA '90) - Republican former member of the Texas House of Representatives from Grand Prairie
- Cindy Burkett (BA '04 Political Science) - Republican former member of the Texas House of Representatives from Dallas County
- Les Eaves - Republican member of the Arkansas House of Representatives since 2015 and businessman from Searcy, Arkansas
- Sally Kern - former member of the Oklahoma House of Representatives
- Hugh Parmer - former Texas politician and 36th mayor of Fort Worth
- Diane Patrick - Republican former member of the Texas House of Representatives from Arlington
- Betsy Price - 44th mayor of Fort Worth
- Steven Wayne Smith - former justice of the Texas Supreme Court
- Wayne Smith (BS Civil Engineering) - Republican former member of the Texas House of Representatives from Harris County
- Lupe Valdez - Texas' first Hispanic female nominee for governor and Texas' first Hispanic female sheriff
- Royce West - Democratic member of the Texas State Senate
- Ann Wynia - former member of the Minnesota House of Representatives and current president of North Hennepin Community College

=== Sports ===
- Lanny Bassham - 1976 Summer Olympics gold medalist in 50 m rifle
- Kenny Bernstein - drag racing driver and former NASCAR owner; nicknamed the "King of Speed"
- Kaleb Canales - basketball coach; first Mexican-American head coach in NBA history
- Michael Choice - professional baseball player, formerly in MLB; 10th overall draft pick by the Oakland Athletics in the 2010 Major League Baseball draft
- Bruce Collie - former NFL player
- Jared Connaughton - former Olympic track athlete for Canada
- Scott Cross - basketball coach, former head and assistant men's basketball coach at UTA; also a former player at UTA
- Roy Dewalt - former Canadian Football League quarterback of the 1980s, mostly with the British Columbia Lions
- Steve Foster - baseball coach and former MLB player for the Cincinnati Reds
- Jinh Yu Frey - professional mixed martial artist and current Invicta FC Atomweight Champion
- Takeshi Fujiwara - Olympic track athlete for Japan and previously El Salvador
- Dillon Gee - former MLB player
- Kevin Hervey - professional basketball player
- Trey Hillman - baseball coach; manager of the Kansas City Royals 2008–2010
- John Lackey - former MLB player and three-time World Series champion
- Darryl Lewis - former NFL player
- Mark Lowe - professional baseball player, formerly in MLB
- Tim McKyer - former NFL player and three-time Super Bowl champion
- Adam Moore - professional baseball player, formerly in MLB
- Cliff Odom - former NFL football player
- Daniel Ortmeier - former MLB player for the San Francisco Giants
- Dave Owen - former MLB player
- Hunter Pence - former MLB player and two-time World Series champion
- Mike Rhyner - founder of Sports Radio 1310AM The Ticket in Dallas
- Ryan Roberts - former MLB player
- Douglas Russell - 1968 Summer Olympics swimming gold medalist in 100 m butterfly and 4 × 100 m medley relay
- Austen Smith - 2024 Summer Olympics silver medalist in mixed skeet shooting and bronze medalist in women's skeet shooting

== Notable faculty and staff ==
- Dereje Agonafer - mechanical engineering professor; first home grown member of National Academy of Engineering
- Ishfaq Ahmad - professor of computer science and engineering, IEEE Fellow, and notable researcher in high-performance computing and video coding
- Dale A. Anderson - professor of aerospace engineering; former vice president for Research and Dean of Graduate Studies
- Michael P. Buckley - director of the Property Repositioning Program
- Ramez Elmasri - associate chair, Computer Science and Engineering Department
- George Fix - mathematician who collaborated on several seminal papers and books in the field of finite element method
- José Ángel Gutiérrez - political science professor, lawyer, and founding member and past president of the La Raza Unida Party
- Susan Hekman - political science professor and director of the graduate humanities program
- Catheleen Jordan - professor of social work
- Charles T. McDowell - professor emeritus and former director of the Center for Post-Soviet and Eastern European Studies
- Nils O Myklestad - professor of mechanical and aerospace engineering; an authority on mechanical vibration
- David R Nygren - Presidential Distinguished Professor; experimental particle physicist; member of the National Academy of Sciences; inventor of the Time Projection Chamber; recipient of the 2018 Marie Curie award of the IEEE
- Stanley Palmer - professor of history; scholar of British history; member of the UT Arlington Academy of Distinguished Teachers (1996)
- Vasant K. Prabhu - electrical engineering professor; IEEE Life Fellow; inventor of communication system designs
- K. R. Rao - electrical engineering professor; IEEE Fellow; inventor of discrete cosine transform
- Allan Saxe - political science professor, author, philanthropist
