= 1995 Pampa tornado =

Violent F4 tornado

- The tornado as it was approaching the western portions of Pampa.

Meteorological history
- Formed: June 8, 1995, 4:27 p.m. CDT (UTC−21:31)
- Dissipated: June 8, 1995, 4:47 p.m. CDT (UTC−21:31)
- Duration: 20 minutes

F4 tornado
- on the Fujita scale
- Path length: 3 miles (4.8 km)
- Highest winds: 207–260 mph (333–418 km/h)

Overall effects
- Fatalities: 0
- Injuries: 7
- Damage: $30 million(1995 USD)
- Areas affected: Gray County, Texas, particularly within the city limits of Pampa, Texas
- Part of the 1995 Texas Panhandle tornado outbreak and Tornadoes of 1995

In the afternoon hours of June 8, 1995, a violent but short-lived F4 rated tornado tore through the city limits of Pampa, Texas. It was one of three F4 tornadoes that formed during a tornado outbreak that occurred in the Texas and Oklahoma panhandle, being extensively documented by storm chasers observing the tornado. It injured 7 and caused $30 million in damages, making it the costliest during the outbreak.

The tornado began near the town center of Pampa, organizing into a "drill bit" structure as it tore through a few industrial buildings. Storm chasers reported the tornado as it moved southwest towards the industrial district of the city. Warehouses were torn apart by the violent winds and vehicles were lofted in the air. The tornado later dissipated around 20 minutes after its initial formation, 3 miles (4.8 km) southwest of Pampa. Footage and photographs of the tornado captured an enormous debris field consisting of materials from industrial buildings and vehicles. The F4 rating was based on the movement of these debris at high speeds, analyzed from video footage.

== Meteorological synopsis ==
On June 8, 1995, an unstable storm environment over the Texas Panhandle set place for a violent tornado outbreak that featured 29 tornadoes. The air near the ground was very warm and humid, with dewpoints of 22-23° Celsius, with CAPE values of 5380 J/kg that supported intense supercells and tornadoes. Thunderstorms formed along a dryline within the Texas Panhandle. One supercell that formed near McLean, Texas produced five tornadoes, including the Pampa F4.

Along with the Pampa tornado, two other F4 tornadoes occurred near Wheeler County and Allison, Texas. All three of these tornadoes had controversies in their assigned rating and that all potentially had F5 strength. A total of 29 tornadoes formed during the outbreak, causing 11 injuries.

== Tornado summary ==
Radar loop showing supercells during the afternoon of June 8, 1995.

After a weak F0 rated tornado dissipated within Gray County, Texas, the Pampa supercell produced a funnel at 4:27p.m. CDT near the center of town. The tornado tracked southwest at a relatively slow pace, moving out of Pampa towards the industrial district of town. Storm chasers Alan Moller and Charles A. Doswell III took several photographs of the tornado as it tore through the industrial area, creating a large debris field circulating around the tornado. Former Gray County local Sheriff Randy Stubblefield shot incredible videotape footage of the tornado while he was driving in his vehicle along Highway 60 on duty.

=== Destruction to industrial buildings ===
F2-F3 damage was done to the industrial buildings that were completely shredded by the tornado. Debris from equipment orbited around the funnel. Some vehicles from an oil company parking lot were tossed and thrown out of the tornado. Video taken by Randy Stubblefield showed pickup trucks and vans being lofted out of the tornado around 80–90 feet (24–27 m) above the ground. Thomas P. Grazulis in his 2001 book "F5-F6 tornadoes", noted that the F4 rating was assigned from video footage of the movements of debris circulating around the tornado, estimating F4 intensity. He also mentioned how the tornado likely had winds in excess of 300 mph (480 km/h) and that "In my opinion, if there ever was an F6 tornado caught on video, it was the Pampa, Texas tornado of 1995". As the tornado continued southwest, it would deteriorate in intensity, eventually dissipating after around 20 minutes, tracking for 3 miles (4.8 km).

=== Hoover, Texas F2 tornado ===
After the dissipation of the F4 tornado, the Pampa supercell produced a larger tornado near Hoover, Texas that narrowly avoided the Rufe Jordan Unit Prison. Similarly to the Pampa tornado, video footage − captured by storm chaser Martin Lisius − of this tornado became popular and it was also argued to be stronger than the F4, possibly having F5 intensity, though it was only rated F2.

== Aftermath ==
The tornado destroyed 50 homes and 25 businesses. An additional 150 homes and 25 other businesses suffered damage. Seven people were hospitalized but despite the intense destruction caused by the tornado, zero fatalities were reported. This was likely due to the fact that the tornado was highly visible and early warnings from the storm.

Overall, the tornado caused $30 million in damages, making it the costliest tornado to hit Pampa and the costliest during the entire outbreak on June 8th. The second and third F4 tornadoes of the outbreak occurred over Wheeler County, causing intense damage over rural fields. On April 24, 2012, Pampa officially became a StormReady community during a ceremony, making residents better prepared in case of another tornado striking town. During the Tornado outbreak of November 16-18, 2015, two violent nocturnal tornadoes − both rated EF3 − produced severe damage near Pampa. No fatalities were reported during the event.

== In popular culture ==
The Pampa tornado was featured in Martin Lisius' documentary "The Chasers of Tornado Alley" (2014). Randy Stubblefield's footage of the tornado has since been reposted into social media and became popular among the storm chasing community. The tornado was also featured in a documentary created by Spark, highlighting eyewitness accounts of the tornado with Randy Stubblefield, Charles A. Doswell III, and other survivors of the event.
