= Tornadoes of 1995 =

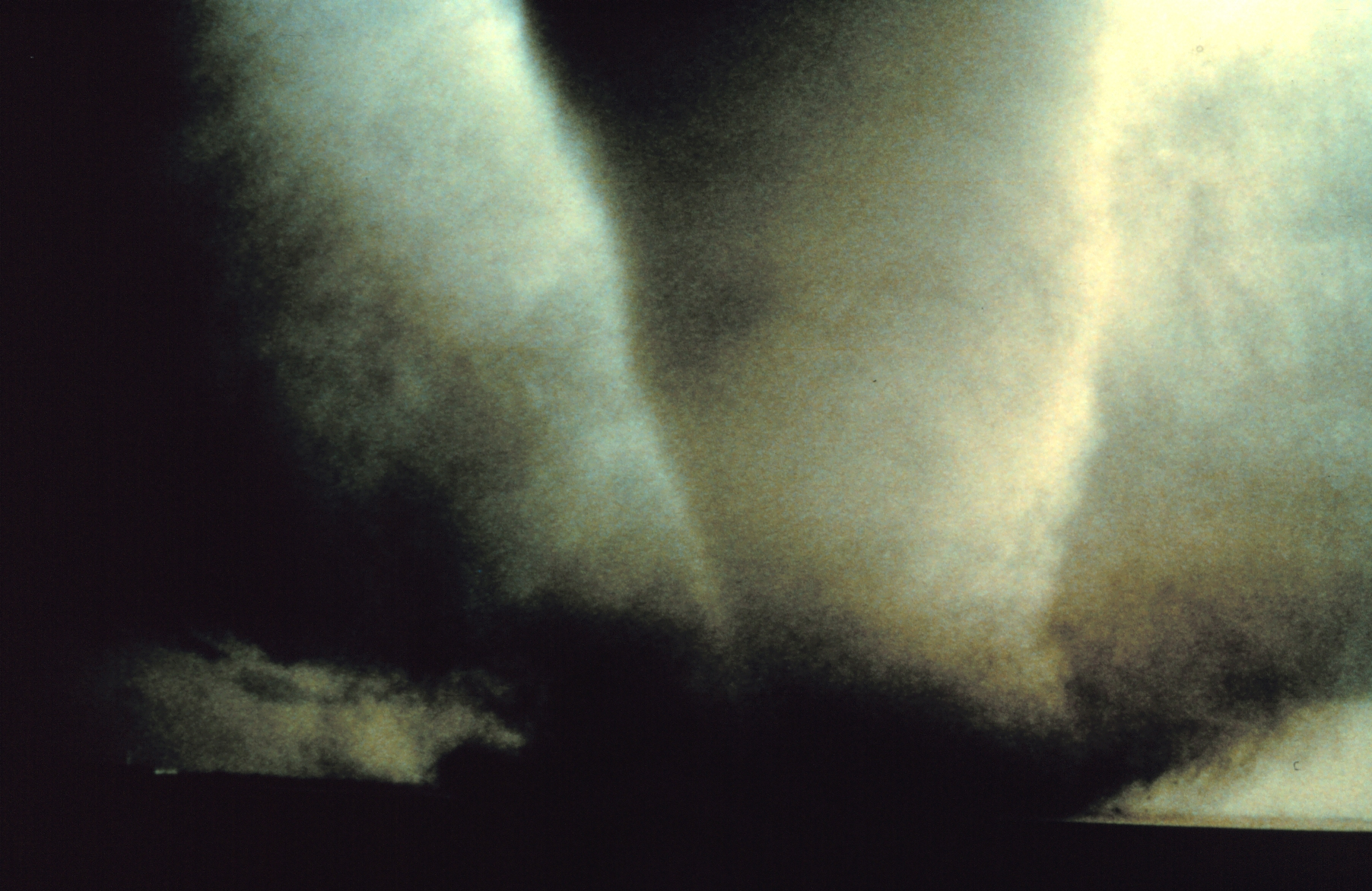
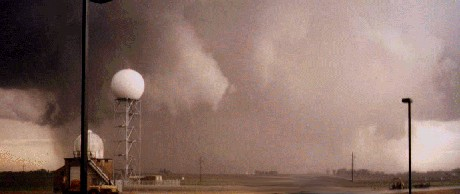
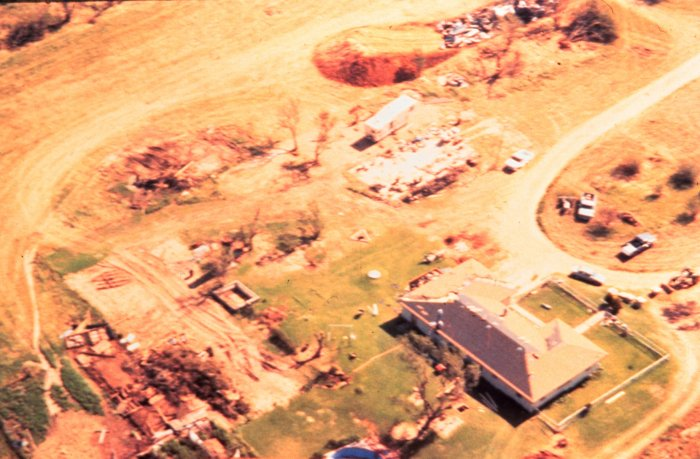
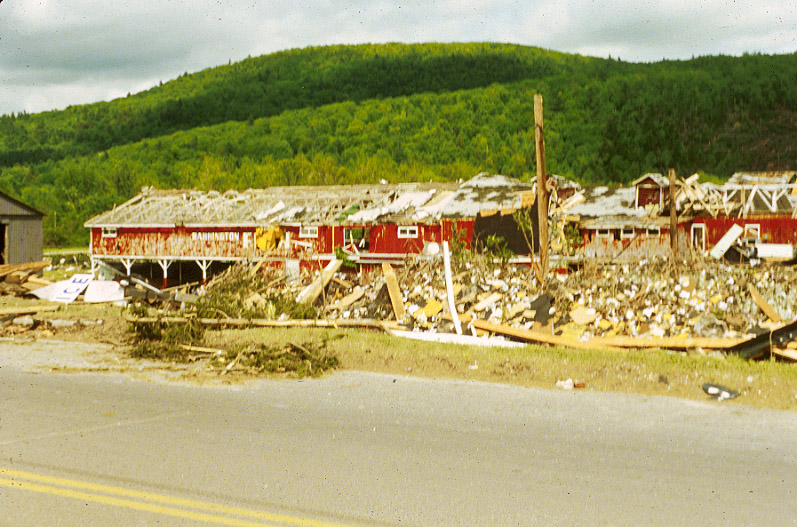
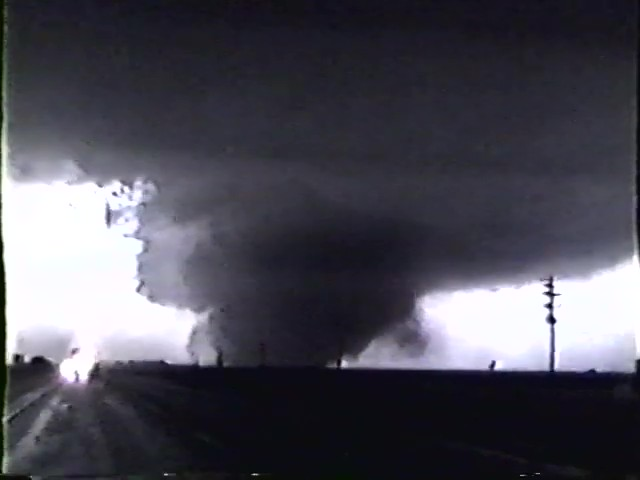
- Clockwise from top: A large F2+ tornado shortly after formation near Dimmitt, Texas on June 2, 1995; Damage to a farm near Kellerville, Texas after an F4+ tornado on June 8; Damage to fairgrounds in Great Barrington, Massachusetts after an F4 tornado on May 29; A large F3+ tornado near Friona, Texas on June 2; A radar loop showing the supercell that produced an F4 tornado that struck Great Barrington, Massachusetts on May 29; A large F3 tornado that passed near Lincoln, Illinois on May 9.
- Timespan: January - December 1995
Maximum rated tornado
F4 tornado
- List
  – Niota, Illinois
  on May 13
  – Lewistown, Illinois
  on May 13
  – Ethridge, Tennessee
  on May 18
  – Harvest, Alabama
  on May 18
  – Auburn, Iowa
  on May 27
  – Stuart, Iowa
  on May 27
  – Scranton, Iowa
  on May 27
  – Great Barrington, Massachusetts
  on May 29
  – Pampa, Texas
  on June 8
  – Kellerville, Texas
  on June 8
  – Allison, Texas
  on June 8
  – Marion, South Carolina
  on November 7
- Tornadoes in U.S.: 1,186
- Damage (U.S.): >$190 million
- Fatalities (U.S.): 30
- Fatalities (worldwide): >70

This page documents the tornadoes and tornado outbreaks of 1995, primarily in the United States. Most tornadoes form in the U.S., although some events may take place internationally. Tornado statistics for older years like this often appear significantly lower than modern years due to fewer reports or confirmed tornadoes, but by the 1990s, tornado statistics were coming closer to the numbers seen today.

== Synopsis ==
Fatal United States tornadoes in 1995
- Approximate touchdown location of killer tornadoes in 1995 Summary of tornadoes: January 6 – North Carolina (1 death); January 7 – Florida (1 death); January 18 – Louisiana (1 death); February 16 – Alabama (6 deaths); April 11 – Mississippi (1 death); May 7 – Texas (1 death); May 7 – Texas (2 deaths); May 7 – Texas, Oklahoma (3 deaths); May 13 – Indiana (3 deaths); May 18 – Tennessee (3 deaths); May 18 – Alabama (1 death); May 29 – Massachusetts (3 deaths); October 4 – Florida (1 death); November 10 – Arkansas (2 deaths); December 19 – Florida (1 death); Total fatalities: 30

The season peaked in May with a near-record of 392 tornadoes that month. June brought over 200 tornadoes, including several that became famous for their videos. The death total for the year was relatively low at 30 (fewest since 1986).

== Events ==
Confirmed tornado total for the entire year 1995 in the United States.

Confirmed tornadoes by Fujita rating
FU	F0	F1	F2	F3	F4	F5	Total
0	822	234	98	20	12	0	1,186

== January ==
There were 36 tornadoes confirmed in the United States in January. A total of three people were killed in the Southeast US from separate tornadoes during the month.

== February ==
There were seven tornadoes confirmed in the United States in February.

=== February 13 (Ireland) ===
A strong F3 tornado struck the town of Youghal, in County Cork. At 7:20 am GMT, the tornado began over the sea and moved onshore, where it struck a campsite. Here, mobile homes were picked up and thrown up to 20 m away, some of which were destroyed. Roofs and chimneys were damaged as well. The tornado traveled for 3 km, and was 50 metres wide. No casualties were reported. It is the strongest tornado ever recorded in Ireland.

=== February 16 (United States) ===
An F3 tornado killed six people and injured 130 in Arab, Alabama, making it the tornado responsible for the most deaths in 1995.

== March ==
There were 49 tornadoes confirmed in the United States in March.

== April ==
There were 130 tornadoes confirmed in the United States in April.

== May ==
There were 392 tornadoes confirmed in the United States in May.

=== May 6–27 ===
FU	F0	F1	F2	F3	F4	F5
0	137	84	39	14	4	0

A long-lived series of deadly tornado outbreaks occurred throughout almost the entire month of May; 13 deaths occurred due to the outbreaks. Nearly 300 tornadoes, including four that were rated F4, occurred during this period from the Central US through the Southeast and into the Mid-Atlantic.

=== May 29 ===
An unusual F4 tornado killed three people in Berkshire County, Massachusetts. A car was thrown 1000 ft, which was the basis for the F4 rating.

== June ==
There were 216 tornadoes confirmed in the United States in June.

=== June 2 ===
An F3 tornado scraped the south side of Friona, Texas before maturing into a major wedge east of town. A dozen injuries were reported, but no fatalities.

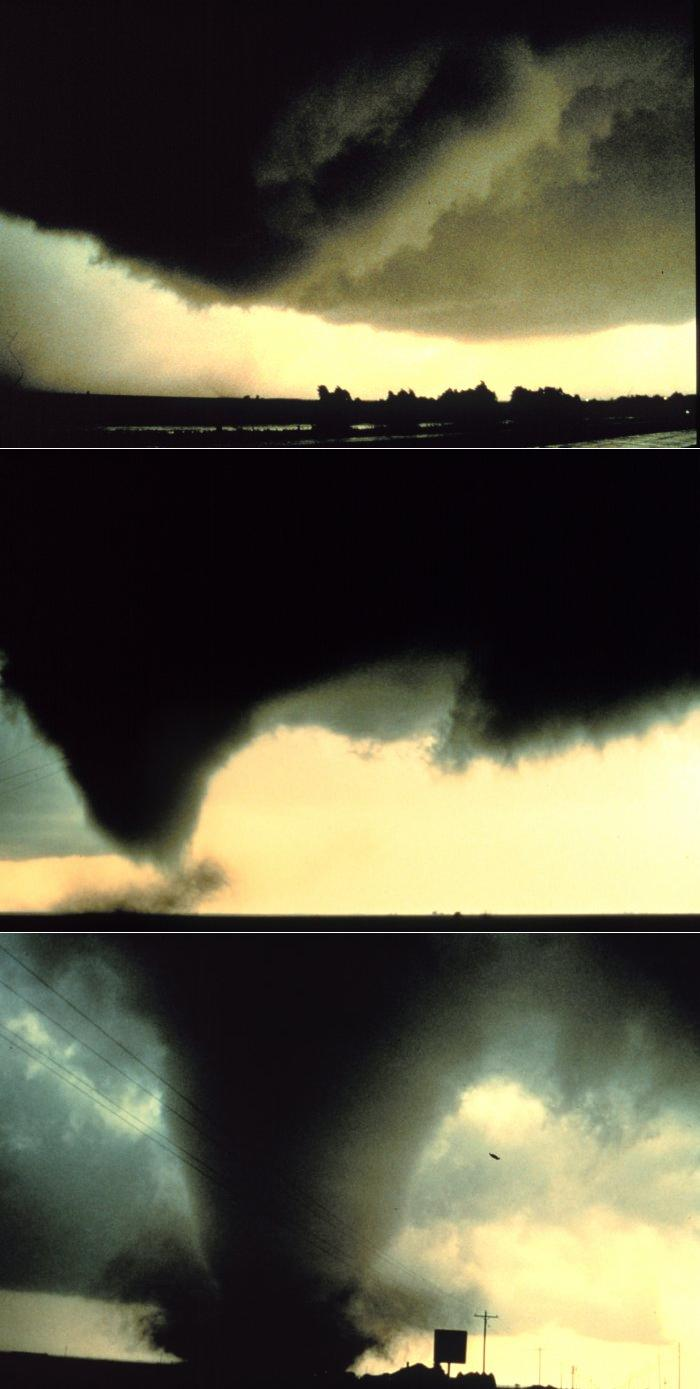
This sequence of three photographs was taken by a member of the VORTEX project outside of Dimmit, TX on June 2, 1995. Known to some as the most studied tornado of all time, multiple movies, radar images, photographs, and damage observations.

The Dimmitt tornado, which occurred on June 2, 1995, in Texas, was an F2 tornado that resulted in three injuries but no fatalities. It is notable for being one of the most thoroughly observed tornadoes in history, as it was closely studied by the VORTEX project, which aimed to understand tornado formation and behavior. The tornado was covered closely by the Probe 1 Vortex team, making it "the most comprehensively observed tornado in history."

=== June 5 ===
A large wedge-shaped tornado crossed Highway 70 near Dougherty, Texas as it tracked southeast.

=== June 8 ===
Several tornadoes in the Texas Panhandle caused widespread destruction on June 8, 1995. The Pampa F4 tornado, among the first tornadoes of the day, struck the industrial section of the town. Storm chasers and meteorologists Alan Moller and Charles A. Doswell III were in the town when the tornado began and were able to capture significant photos and video as the tornado tore through the city. As the Pampa, Texas tornado began to dissipate, the initial ground circulation for the second and larger tornado from that supercell began at 4:50 pm east of Pampa and developed into a large, intense tornado as it passed just north of the Rufe Jordan Unit Prison. This tornado is called the "Hoover Tornado" by storm chasers since it passed close to the small community of Hoover, Texas northeast of Pampa. The Hoover, Texas tornado was rated F5 by storm chaser Martin Lisius and meteorologist Dr. Herbert Fiala based on video photogrammetry the team conducted after the event. Two other intense tornadoes spawned later by a separate supercell near Allison and Kellerville, Texas were also captured on video. None of those tornadoes caused fatalities. The Kellerville tornado has been debated to be of F5 strength, though the final National Weather Service rating was F4. Both the Hoover and Kellerville tornadoes were especially intense and removed asphalt from roadways leaving only dirt behind as shown in the documentary film, "The Chasers of Tornado Alley" produced by Martin Lisius.

== July ==
There were 162 tornadoes confirmed in the United States in July.

== August ==
There were 53 tornadoes confirmed in the United States in August.

== September ==
There were 19 tornadoes confirmed in the United States in September.

== October ==
There were 74 tornadoes confirmed in the United States in October.

=== October 6 (Dominican Republic) ===
An F2 tornado destroyed several homes, killing two people in La Caleta near International Airport Las Americas. It's the only tornado known in the Dominican Republic to take out people's lives and, therefore, the deadliest in the country's history.

== November ==
There were 79 tornadoes confirmed in the United States in November.

=== November 7 ===
FU	F0	F1	F2	F3	F4	F5
0	21	13	6	0	1	0

A moderate tornado outbreak took place mainly over North Carolina, South Carolina and Georgia, with 41 tornadoes confirmed in total. 28 tornadoes were confirmed in South Carolina alone, which made it the largest tornado outbreak in the state at the time until the Hurricane Frances tornado outbreak in 2004, when 42 tornadoes touched down in that state. A rare, short lived F4 tornado touched down just east of Marion, South Carolina, although the rating is disputed. It would be the last F4/EF4+ tornado confirmed in South Carolina until April 13, 2020.

=== November 10–11 ===
FU	F0	F1	F2	F3	F4	F5
0	9	19	3	2	0	0

An F2 tornado killed two people north of Des Arc, Arkansas during the overnight hours of November 11.

== December ==
There were 18 tornadoes confirmed in the United States in December.

== See also ==
- Tornado
  - Tornadoes by year
  - Tornado records
  - Tornado climatology
  - Tornado myths
- List of tornado outbreaks
  - List of F5 and EF5 tornadoes
  - List of North American tornadoes and tornado outbreaks
  - List of 21st-century Canadian tornadoes and tornado outbreaks
  - List of European tornadoes and tornado outbreaks
  - List of tornadoes and tornado outbreaks in Asia
  - List of Southern Hemisphere tornadoes and tornado outbreaks
  - List of tornadoes striking downtown areas
- Tornado intensity
  - Fujita scale
  - Enhanced Fujita scale
