= Alan Moller =

American meteorologist (1950–2014)

Al Moller
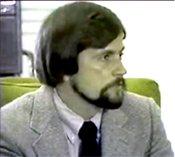
- Born: February 1, 1950; Fort Worth, Texas, U.S.
- Died: June 19, 2014 (aged 64); Ft. Worth, Texas, U.S.
- Education: University of Oklahoma (OU)
- Known for: Storm spotter training, weather forecasting, photography
- Scientific career
- Fields: Meteorology
- Workplaces: National Weather Service
- Thesis: The Climatology and Synoptic Meteorology of Southern Plains' Tornado Outbreaks (1979)

Alan Roger Moller (February 1, 1950 – June 19, 2014) was an American meteorologist, storm chaser, nature and landscape photographer known for advancing spotter training and bridging operational meteorology (particularly severe storms forecasting) with research.

== Early years ==
Moller was born in Fort Worth, Texas, on February 1, 1950, grew up in the suburb Benbrook and in the South Hills section of Ft. Worth, where he attended R. L. Paschal High School. He studied meteorology at the University of Oklahoma (OU) where he earned B.S. and M.S. degrees in the late 1960s and early 1970s. He made a career as a forecaster at the National Weather Service (NWS).

== Storm prediction pioneer ==
Based on a spotter network he launched in North Texas, Moller was foundational in developing the national Skywarn storm spotter training program. He produced, appeared in, and provided photography for its training film, and the associated slide show and pamphlet, Tornadoes: A Spotter's Guide (1977), and its follow-up training video StormWatch (1995). He was influential in developing new spotter training materials throughout the 1970s that were used nationally and he continued to refine training materials and techniques throughout his career. Moller intensively trained spotters in his NWS office area of responsibility in North Texas as well as around the country by way of frequent speaking engagements. Himself an amateur radio operator, he was enthusiastic at the ground truth information provided via amateur radio.

He collaboratively developed the concept of the "integrated warning system" (IWS), devoting his career so that each of the elements of forecast, detection, dissemination, and public response be understood as critical in a chain of successful mitigation of hazards.

Moller also worked at the Lubbock NWS office for some years, where he developed flash flooding forecasting and nowcasting guidance. He implored the importance of recognizing risks when multiple hazards may occur such as when forecasters may focus on the tornado and hail threat from the anticipated supercells. After significant events, from societal impacts, meteorological magnitude, or missed forecasts, Moller embarked case studies where he analyzed surface, satellite, radar, weather balloon, and other weather data (importantly wind profilers as augmenting sparse upper air data) to identify subtle features on meteorology, bringing smaller scale features and atmospheric ingredients methodologies to higher prominence. He also demonstrated the value of hand analysis of atmospheric features.

Moller believed that storm chasing was important in providing field experience for spotter trainers as well for forecasting convective weather. He viewed chasing as an important avenue in providing imagery illustrating storm processes for spotter training and public preparedness. Moller passionately photographed storms and skyscapes, actively shared this imagery, and was also a noted nature and landscape photographer. Moller began chasing as a graduate student of OU and was a participant in the first organized scientific storm chasing projects, such as the NSSL/OU Tornado Intercept Project (TIP), in the early 1970s. He was a forecaster for Project VORTEX in 1994–1995.

Moller participated in major pieces of media coverage regarding forecasting storms and storm spotting and chasing. He was an important contributor to Storm Track magazine and wrote or co-wrote dozens of scientific journal articles, conference papers, and monograph chapters. Moller was a fellow of the American Meteorological Society (AMS). The Texas Severe Storms Association (TESSA) made a formal tribute to Moller upon his retirement and established the Alan R. Moller Severe Weather Education and Research Scholarship a few years prior to his death.

== TESSA ==
In the early 1990s, Moller and storm chaser Martin Lisius formulated the concept for Texas Severe Storms Association (TESSA) in a meeting at the National Weather Service Forecast Office in Fort Worth, Texas. Moller believed that a private sector organization dedicated to severe weather education was needed. In 1993, Lisius founded TESSA as a formal 501(c)(3) non-profit organization. The organization's mission is to bring together both professional meteorologists, storm spotters, and weather enthusiasts in an attempt to better understand dangerous storms through the collection and diffusion of knowledge. Its scope is national but focuses on Texas.

== Media ==
Terrible Tuesday (1984) Moller appears in this documentary about the deadly tornado that struck Wichita Falls, Texas of April 10, 1979.

StormWatch (1995) A storm spotter training video produced by Moller, meteorologist Gary Woodall, and TESSA chairman and filmmaker Martin Lisius with financial support from the Meadows Foundation of Dallas. StormWatch was conceived when Moller approached Lisius and expressed his desire to offer a video that could update the earlier Tornadoes: A Spotter's Guide.

The Chasers of Tornado Alley (1996) Moller and research meteorologist Charles A. Doswell III appear in this award-winning documentary about storm chasing produced and directed by storm chaser and filmmaker Martin Lisius.

== Tributes ==
"Alan R. Moller - Chaser, Photographer, and Forecaster Extraordinaire" written by Charles A. Doswell III

"Some Memories of Al Moller" by Storm Prediction Center meteorologist Roger Edwards

"Remembering Al Moller" by engineer and meteorologist Timothy P. Marshall

== Personal life ==
Moller contracted early-onset Alzheimer's disease and died of complications thereof on June 19, 2014, aged 64. Moller enjoyed drag racing and fast cars, baseball, travel, western art, barbecue, and blues music. He was a recognized photographer, traveling the Plains, American Southwest, and Rocky Mountains to shoot scenes such as wildflowers, mountain and canyon landscapes, sometimes waiting hours for the favorable light.

== See also ==
- Leslie R. Lemon
- Ron Przybylinski
