= Texas Severe Storms Association =

The Texas Severe Storms Association (TESSA) is a national non-profit organization founded in 1993 by storm chaser and TESSA chairman Martin Lisius. The concept of TESSA was developed by both Lisius and National Weather Service meteorologist Alan Moller who believed a private sector educational was needed. The organization’s mission is to bring together both professional meteorologists and weather enthusiasts in an attempt to better understand dangerous storms through the collection and diffusion of knowledge. Its scope is national but focuses on Texas.

== National Storm Conference ==
TESSA hosts the National Storm Conference every March in North Texas. One of the conference highlights is the "Super Storm Spotter" Training Session, which the organization bills as the most advanced storm spotter training available in the nation. The event attracts storm spotters, storm chasers, forecasters, researchers, educators, and emergency managers from across the United States.

Past conference presenters include KXAS-TV meteorologists David Finfrock and Rick Mitchell, Roger Edwards, Charles A. Doswell III, Alan Moller, Martin Lisius, Gary Woodall, Eric Rasmussen, Bill Bunting, Jennifer Dunn, Timothy P. Marshall and other severe weather experts primarily from the National Weather Service, Storm Prediction Center, National Severe Storms Laboratory, universities, private sector, and weather media organizations.

== Cooperation ==
In 1995, TESSA, in partnership with the National Weather Service, produced the StormWatch storm spotter training video, which is used nationally. StormWatch was written and directed by Martin Lisius and co-produced by meteorologists Alan Moller and Gary Woodall.

The North Central Texas Council of Governments (NCTCOG) presented a tornado damage risk assessment in which a major tornado event impacted the Dallas-Ft. Worth Metroplex at TESSA storm conferences including in 2010 and 2014. The project estimated the potential impact of a major tornado outbreak to the Dallas-Fort Worth Metroplex. Modern computer technology (GIS) was used to estimate structures, property, residents, employees, and traffic that would be in the path, better defining the magnitude that the tasks of warning, rescue, and recovery would entail. By identifying such demographics and development, a general assessment of this region's susceptibility to a big tornado outbreak can be made.

== DFW Tornado Scenario ==
The DFW Tornado Scenario is a concept established during a meeting at the National Weather Service Forecast Office in Ft. Worth, Texas on March 24, 2000. The development team included Weather Service meteorologists Alan Moller, Gary Woodall, and Bill Bunting, and Texas Severe Storms Association (TESSA) chairman Martin Lisius. Their objective was to create scientific scenarios in which major tornadoes tracked through the Dallas-Ft. Worth Metroplex in order to be better prepared for those potentially catastrophic events. Just four days following the meeting, a destructive tornado tracked through downtown Ft. Worth on March 28, 2000. The scenario has been presented at multiple TESSA storm conferences since utilizing actual tornado tracks from past events including the Greensburg, Kansas tornado and the El Reno, Oklahoma tornado tracks. Other significant contributors to the development of the scenario include meteorologist and structural engineer Timothy Marshall, and North Central Texas Council of Governments analyst Scott Rae.

== Location ==
The Texas Severe Storms Association is located in Arlington, Texas in the central portion of the Dallas - Ft. Worth Metroplex. Due to its population density and location within Tornado Alley, the Metroplex is believed to be at significant risk from damaging hail, flash flooding, and tornadoes as detailed in the NCTGOG tornado risk assessments, and by the University of Texas at Arlington Climate Change/Extreme Weather Vulnerability and Risk Assessment for Transportation Infrastructure in Dallas and Tarrant Counties. It is for this reason that TESSA was developed and continues to operate as a voice for severe weather safety.

== See also ==
- Tornado
