= Tempest Tours =

U.S. travel company

Tempest Tours, Inc.
- Industry: Travel, Tourism
- Founded: 2000
- Founder: Martin Lisius
- Headquarters: Arlington, Texas
- Website: tempesttours.com

Tempest Tours, Inc. is a U.S. based tour company. Headquartered in Arlington, Texas, the company specializes in weather expeditions on the Great Plains of the United States. During tours, guests have the opportunity to learn from their expert staff of storm spotters, climatologists, and meteorologists on the intricacies of atmospheric science as they track and photograph storms. The company emphasizes safety and education.

Tours are held from late-April through early-July every year.

== History ==
The company was founded in 2000 by Martin Lisius. Tempest Tours started with 3 staff members including Lisius, climatologist William T. Reid, and research meteorologist Charles A. Doswell III, and one van, but have since expanded to over 15 part-time experienced guides with 3 vehicles. The company saw around 20 tourists in their inaugural season, but now host about 200 guests per season.
