= Meadows Foundation =

Meadows Foundation may refer to:

- The Meadows Foundation (Dallas)
- Meadows Foundation (New Jersey) in Somerset, NJ
