= Ron Przybylinski =

American meteorologist (1953–2015)

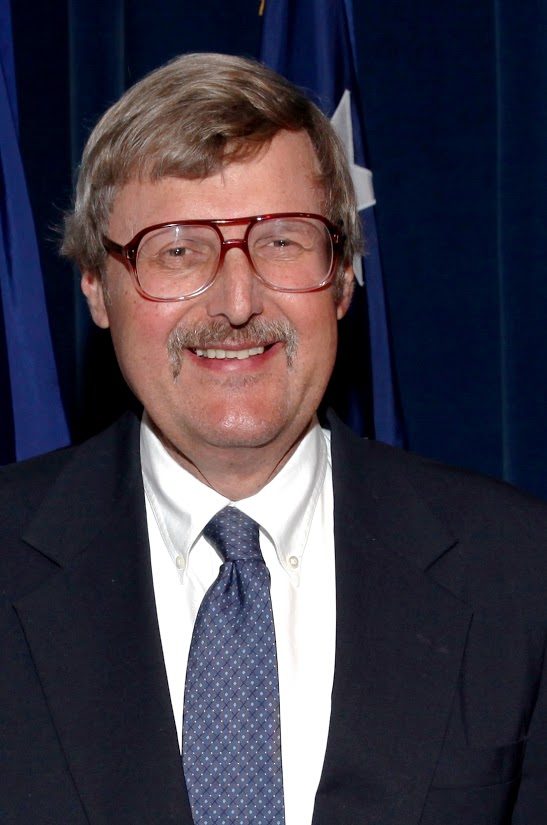
- Born: September 15, 1953; South Bend, Indiana, U.S.
- Died: March 12, 2015 (aged 61); Chicago, Illinois, U.S.
- Education: Saint Louis University (B.S., 1977; M.S., 1981)
- Known for: Weather radar and squall line research
- Awards: NOAA Distinguished Career Award, Charles L. Mitchell Award
- Scientific career
- Fields: Meteorology
- Workplaces: National Weather Service
- Thesis: A Case Study of Intense Convection Occurring on 4 July 1978 in North Dakota (1981)
- Academic advisors: Yeong-Jer Lin

Ronald William Przybylinski (September 15, 1953 – March 12, 2015) was an American meteorologist who made important contributions to understanding of bow echoes, mesovortices, related quasi-linear convective system (QLCS) structures and processes, as well as QLCS related tornadoes. He also was an expert on technical aspects of weather radar and applications to both operational meteorology and research.

== Biography ==
Przybylinski was born near South Bend, Indiana to Casimir and Helen (née Jaworski) Przybylinski, and he graduated from Washington High School in 1972.

Przybylinski earned his degrees at Saint Louis University (SLU): the B.S. degree in Meteorology in 1977, and the M.S. degree in Meteorology in 1981. He worked as the station scientist at the Indianapolis National Weather Service office until 1991, when he moved to the St. Louis NWSFO as Science and Operations Officer (SOO). Ron served as a project leader on the Operational Test and Evaluation of the WSR-88D Doppler radar, during the late 1980s. He most recently was a principal investigator on the severe straight-line winds component of the COMET Cooperative Project with Saint Louis University as well as involved with the Cooperative Institute for Precipitation Systems (CIPS). He was an organizer of and participant in the Bow Echo and Mesoscale Convective Vortex Experiment (BAMEX) of 2003 and a researcher with the Pre-STORM Project of 1985.

Przybylinski was a leading expert on quasi-linear convective systems (QLCS), bow echoes, and mesoscale convective systems (MCSs), and convective winds and tornadogenesis associated with these thunderstorm structures. He intensively studied quasi-linear thunderstorms and their associated winds and tornadoes throughout the 1980s, writing a seminal paper in 1995. Subjects in which he made substantial contributions include derechos, mesoscale convective vortices (MCV), rear-inflow jets (RIJ), line echo wave patterns (LEWP), and high-precipitation (HP) supercells. He was also a leading scientist on tornadoes more generally and was on the NWS Quick Response Team (QRT), a group of experts who rush to assess damage from particularly damaging tornadoes.

Przybylinski actively trained meteorologists, for example, participating heavily in the National Center for Atmospheric Research COMET training (particularly on bow echoes), as well as mentored and collaborated with university students, both graduate and undergraduate. He was dedicated to bridging operational and research meteorology, making significant contributions in bringing research findings to weather warning and forecasting. He published dozens of scientific papers and hundreds of conference presentations. He served on the American Meteorological Society (AMS) Severe Local Storms Committee and as a Councilor of the National Weather Association (NWA). Przybylinski received the NOAA Distinguished Career Award in 2013, the Charles L. Mitchell Award from the AMS in 2012, the T. Theodore Fujita Research Achievement Award from the NWA in 2003, and the NWA Operational Research Award in 1989.

Przybylinski was an avid amateur radio operator, he dabbled in storm chasing, and he enjoyed gardening, in his spare time. He died of cancer while being treated at Northwestern Memorial Hospital in Chicago.

== See also ==
- Donald W. Burgess
- Leslie R. Lemon
- Alan Moller
