= Wilson Block (Dallas, Texas) =

Wilson Block (Dallas) in the National Register of Historic Places

- U.S. National Register of Historic Places
- U.S. Historic district
- Dallas Landmark
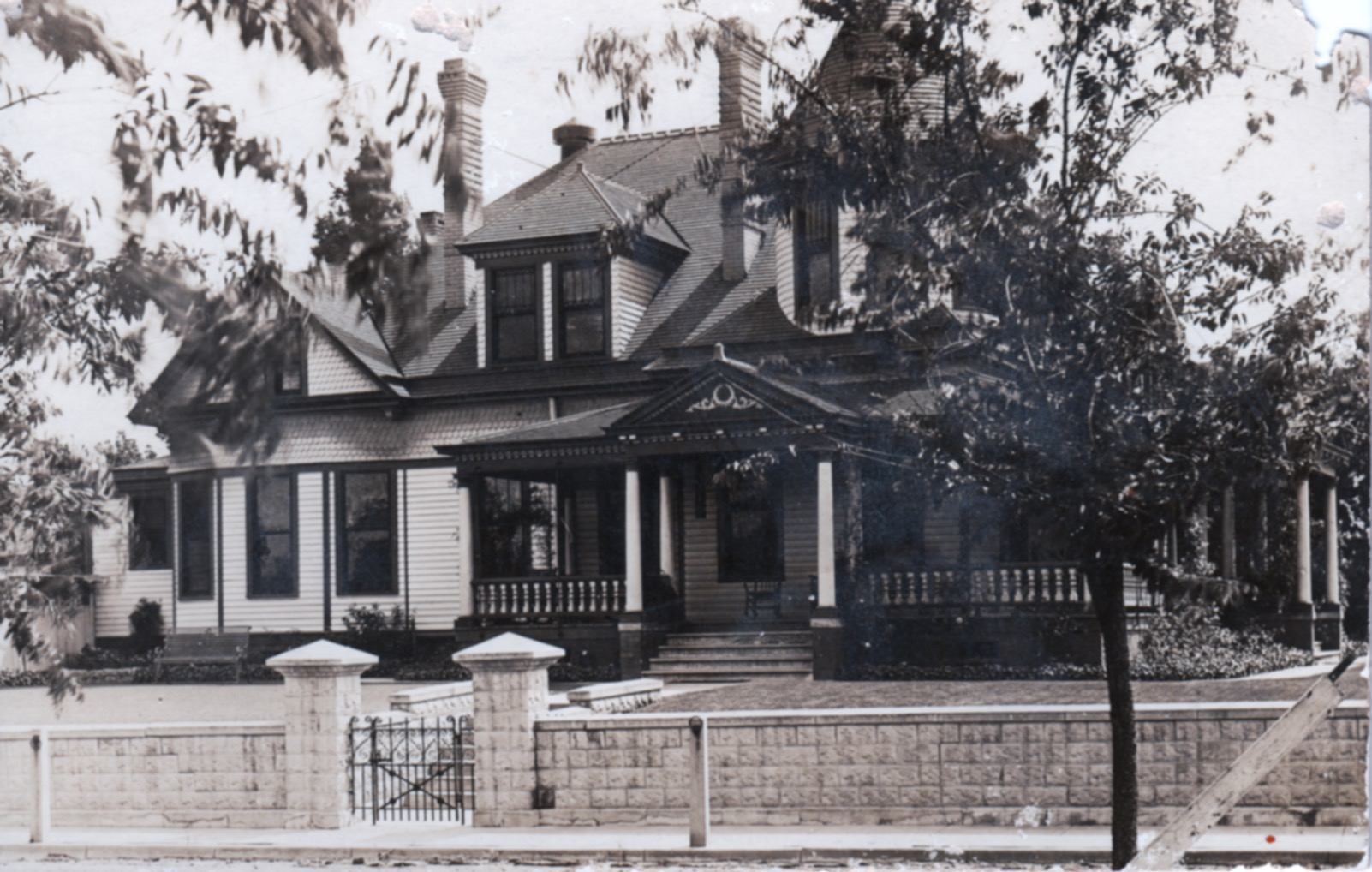
- Wilson House in early 1900s

- Location within Texas Location within the United States
- Location: 2902, 2906, 2910 and 2922 Swiss Ave., Dallas, Texas
- Coordinates: 32.788333°N 96.784722°W
- Area: 2 acres (0.81 ha)
- Built: 1899
- Architectural style: Queen Anne
- Restored: 1980s
- Restored by: The Meadows Foundation
- NRHP reference No.: 78002919
- DLMK No.: H/13

Significant dates
- Added to NRHP: December 15, 1978
- Designated DLMK: April 1981

The Wilson Block is a historic district located in east Dallas, Texas. It was added to the National Register of Historic Places in 1978. The houses have been restored and are maintained to preserve their Victorian revival style architecture. The Wilson Block includes 4 of the original single-family dwellings located at what is now 2902, 2906, 2910 and 2922 Swiss Ave. The District encompasses a city block, 95,000 square feet (8,800 m^{2}), bounded by Swiss Avenue, Floyd, Oak, and Liberty Streets.

The houses that became the center of the Wilson Block Historic District were constructed in 1899–1902, the first being the Wilson House at 2922 Swiss Ave., a 1 1/2-story residence. Construction of an additional 6 rental houses followed, 3 of which have been restored and still remain at 2902, 2906 and 2910 Swiss Ave. Each house is unique in layout and character, but all share some of the common characteristics of the revival styles of the late 1800s, including irregularly shaped roofs that are steeply pitched and dominant front-facing gables.

The homes are 1 1/2-story single-family dwellings constructed of wood with milled details. The siding comprises textured shingles and clapboard. Some were built with front porches, while others wrap around to the sides. The back of some of the houses had rear screened porches on both levels. Upstairs porches were commonly used for sleeping, while the porches downstairs provided an open space to conduct household chores; all had cisterns on each porch. The Wilson House was the only house on the block with servant's quarters and a carriage house.

== Early history ==
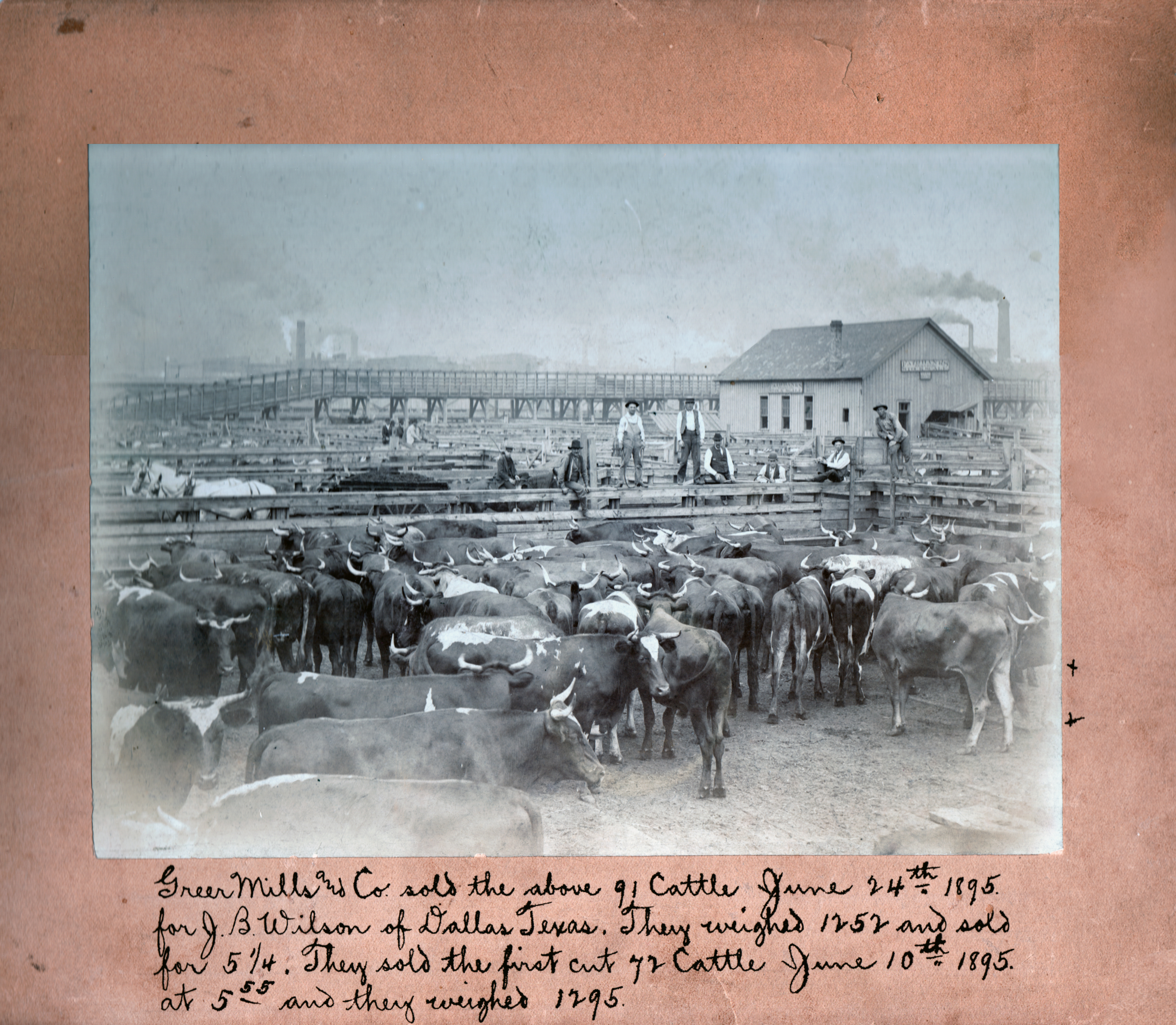

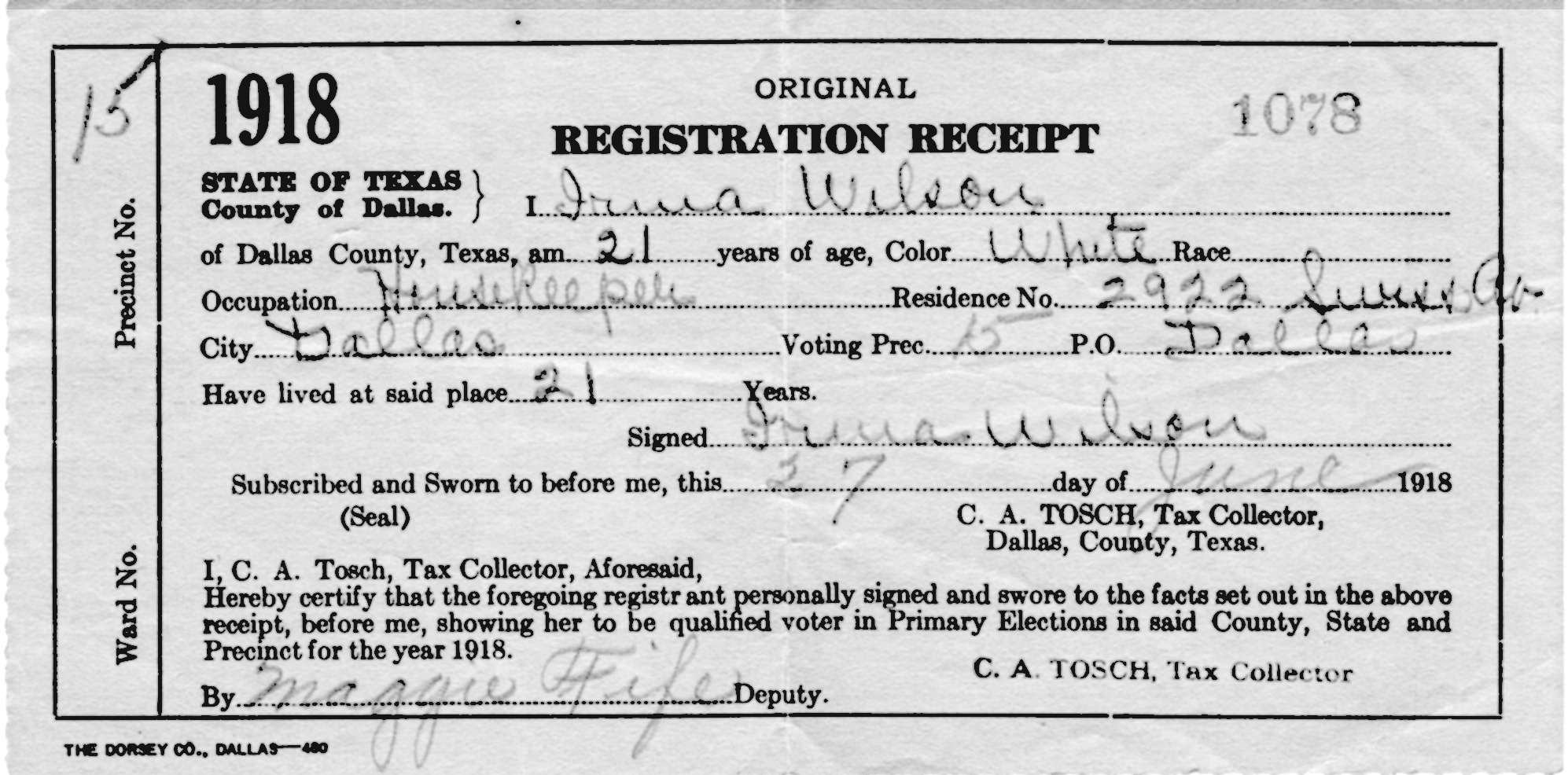
One of the first Texas primary voter registration receipts the year women were granted the right to vote in a Texas primary election.

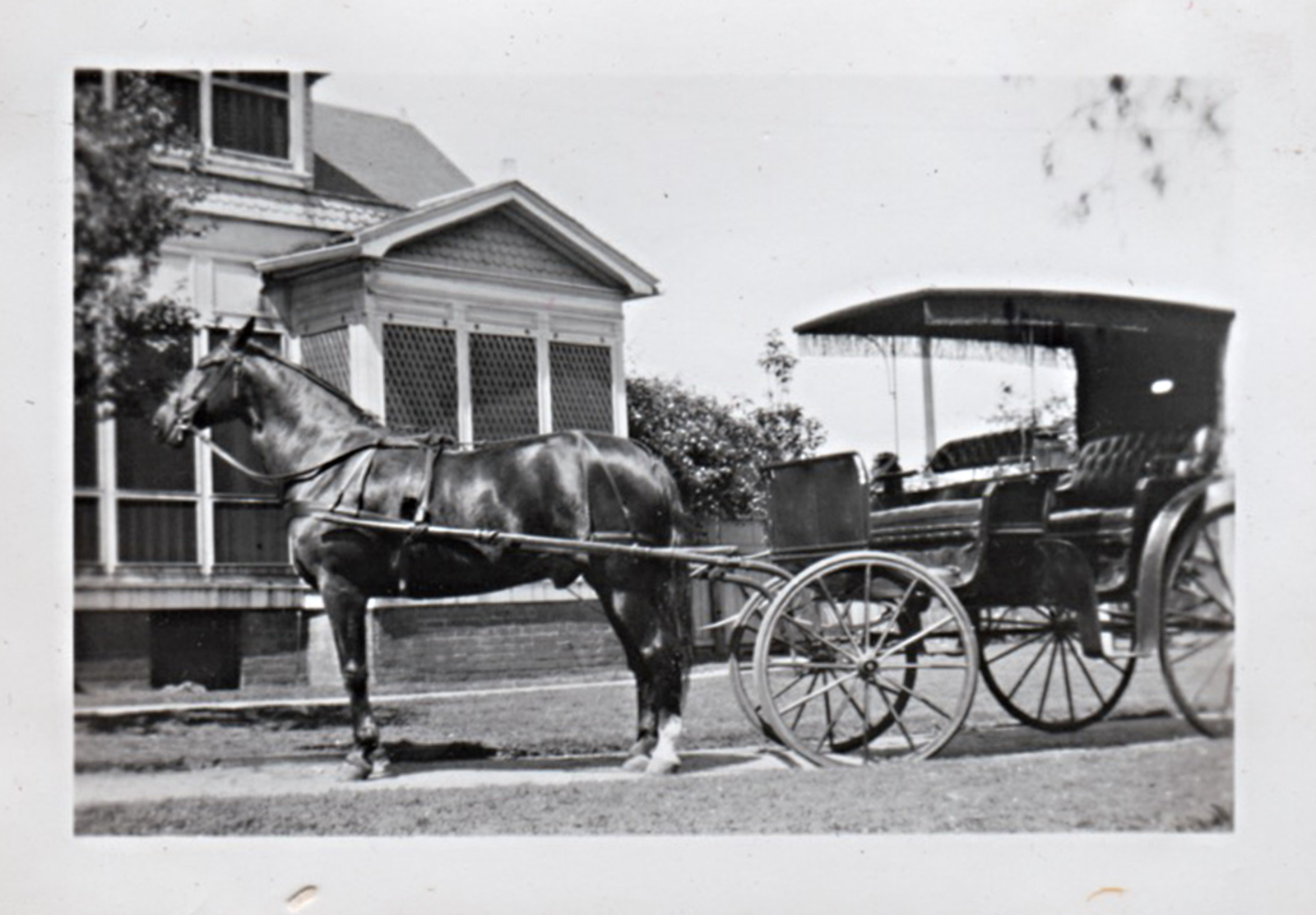
The Wilson's surrey and horse, Buttons

The land was purchased before the Civil War by Jacob Nussbaumer, a Swiss colonist of the La Réunion settlement west of Dallas. In 1898 his widow, Dorothea, and their children sold the block to her niece Henrietta Frichot Wilson (1864–1953), herself the daughter of La Réunion settlers, who paid for it from her separate estate. Henrietta and her husband Frederick P. Wilson (1863–1923), a Canadian-born cattleman and younger brother of J.B. Wilson, built their residence at 2922 Swiss Avenue and six other houses on the block, which the family held for almost eighty years.

Frederick and Henrietta had a son, Laurence Frederick (1895–1981), and a daughter, Irma (1897–1918). Irma attended Highland Park Academy, and was among the first Texas women registered to vote in the July 1918 primary election.

Laurence also attended Highland Park Academy, and continued to live in the Wilson house until 1977. Wilson retained all of the original homes. The property had remained in the Wilson family for close to 80 years. The carriage house is being utilized by Preservation Dallas for educational programs.

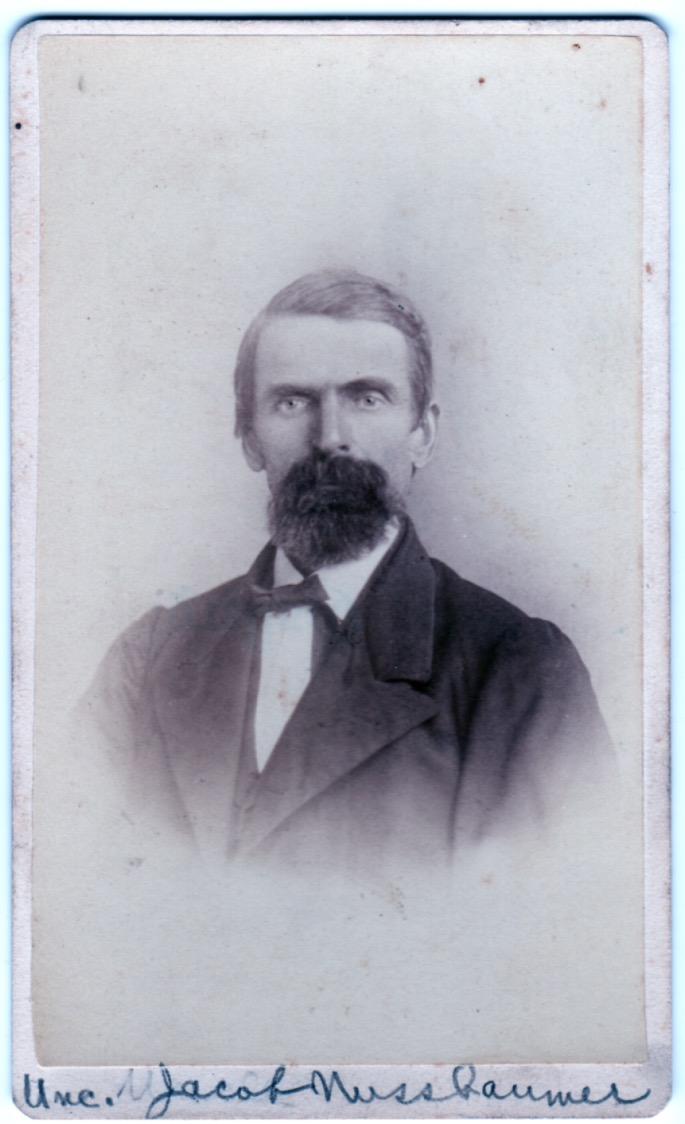
Jacob Nussbaumer, uncle to Henrietta Frichot

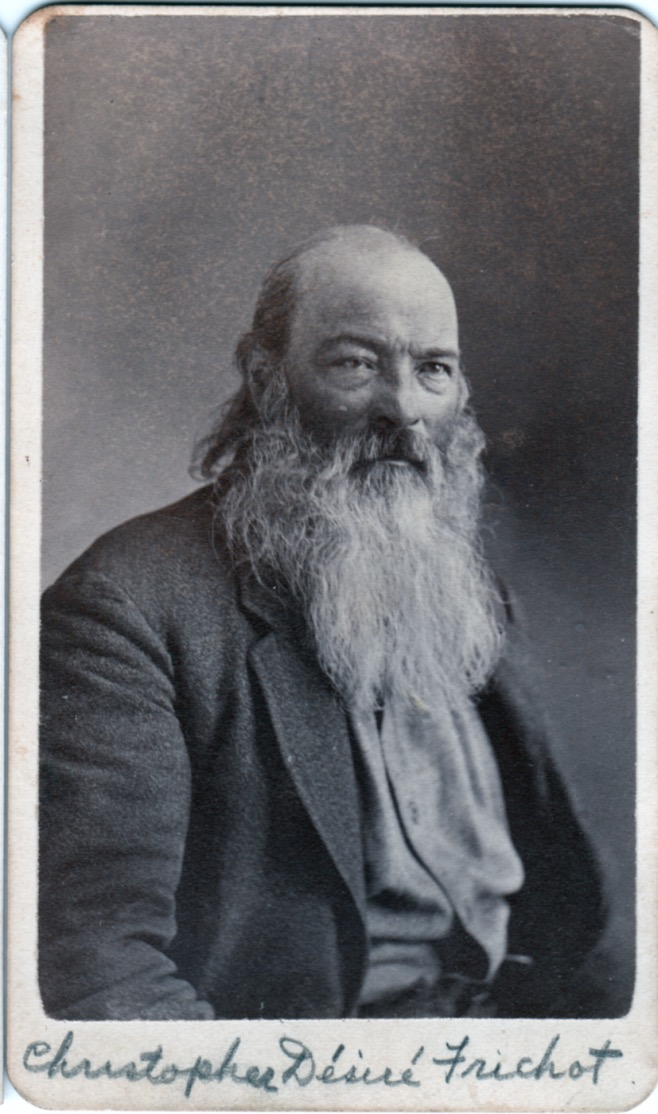
Christopher Desire Frichot, father of Henrietta

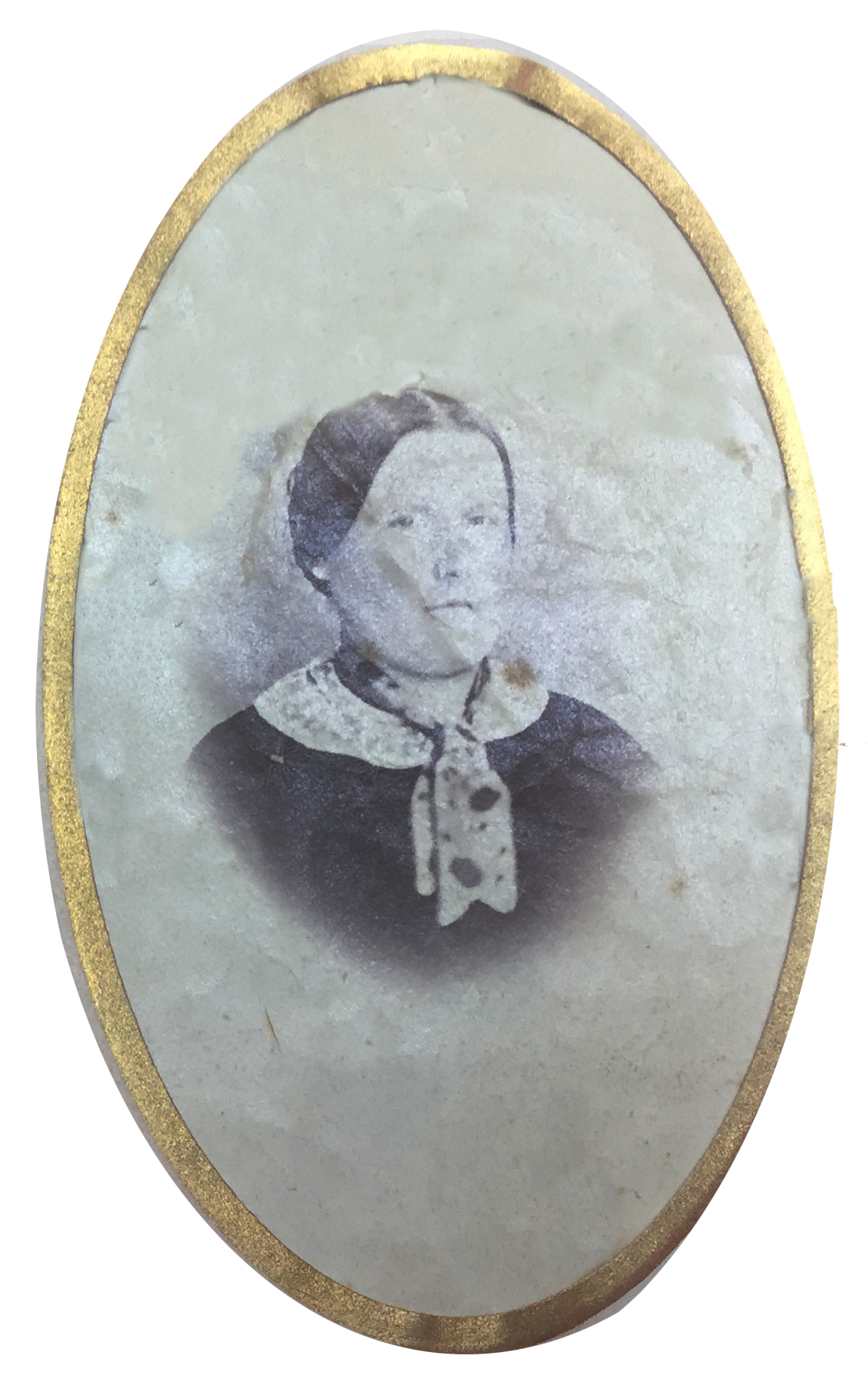
Cleofea "Susan" Boll, wife of C.D. Frichot, mother of Henrietta

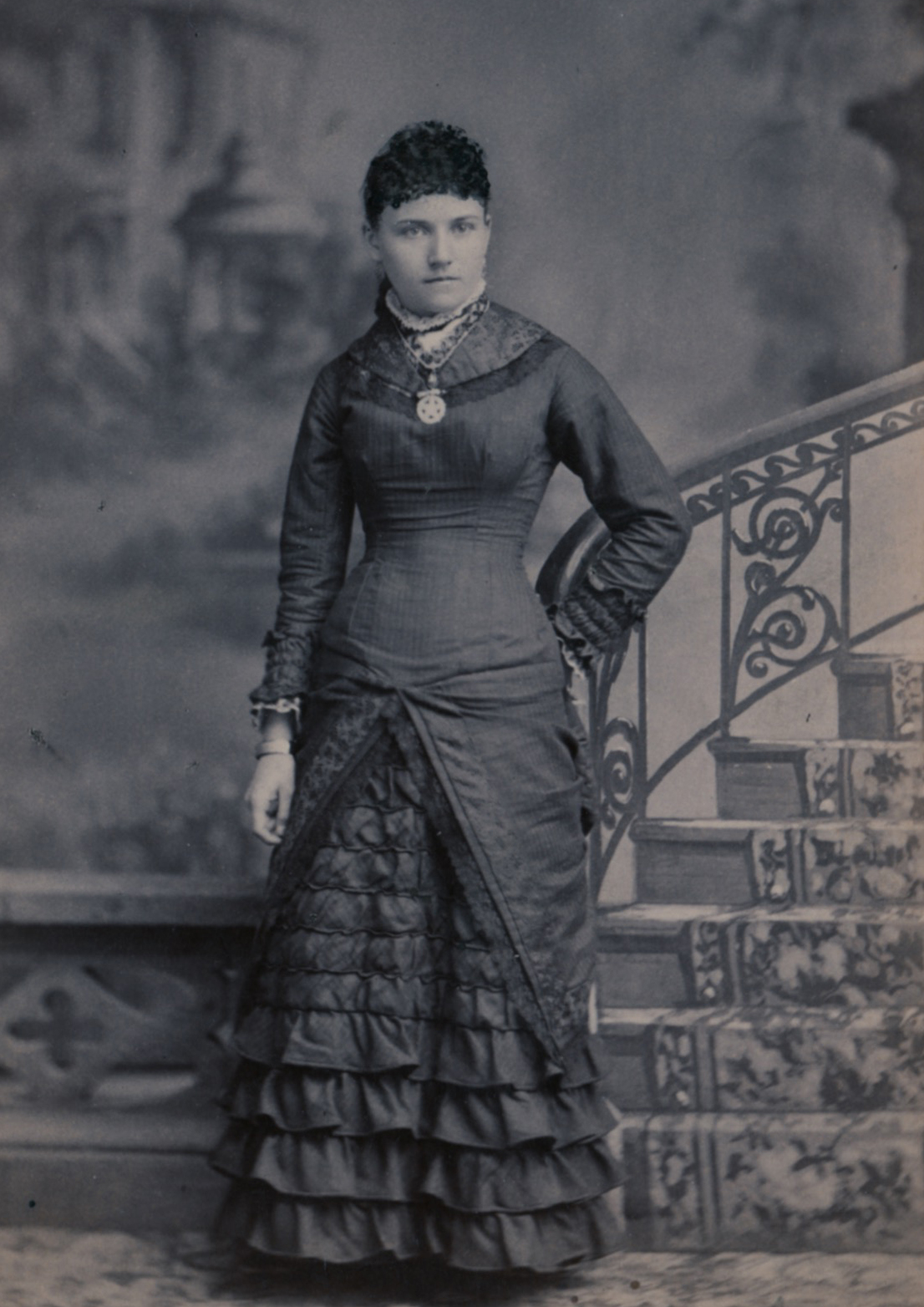
Henrietta Frichot Wilson

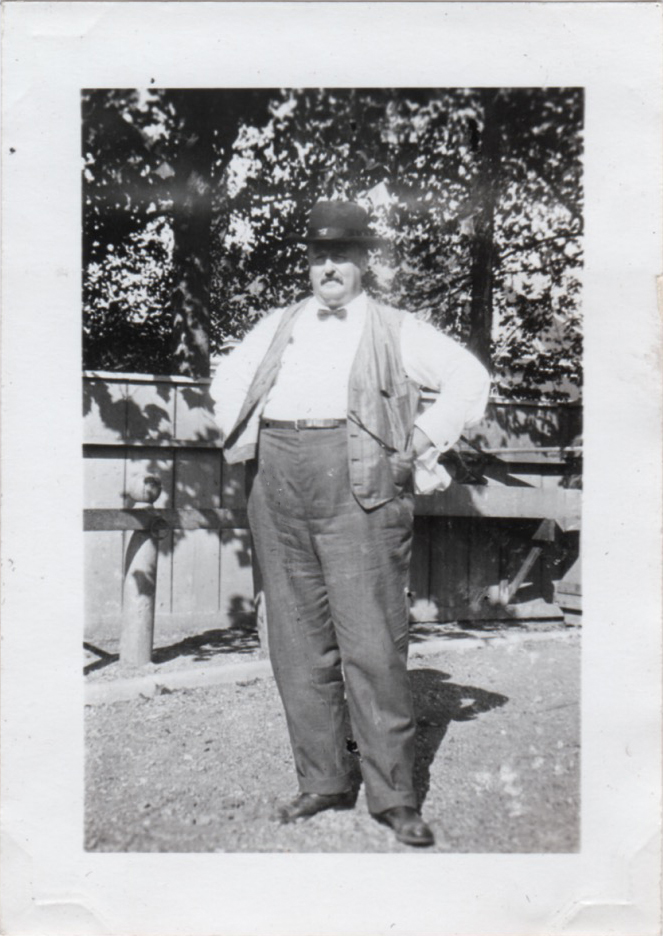
Frederick P. Wilson, standing in his yard, 2922 Swiss Ave.

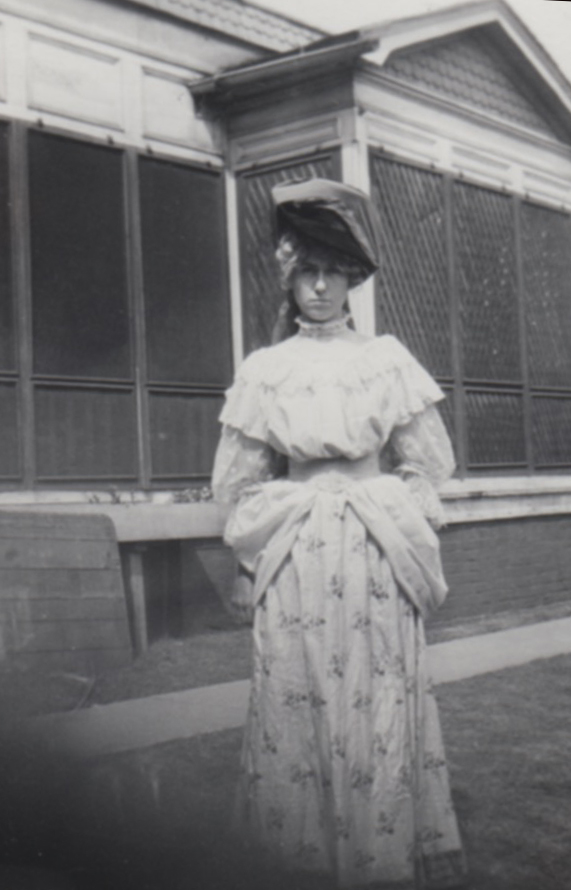
Irma Wilson, posing in the back yard by the porch, 2922 Swiss Ave.

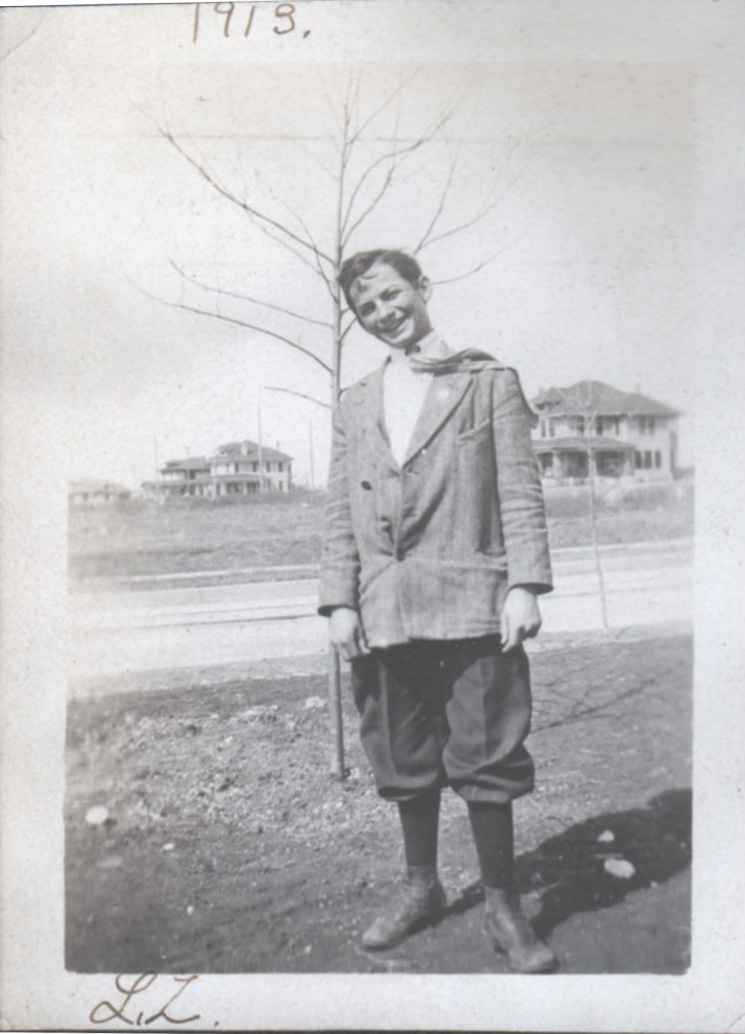
(1913) Laurence Wilson

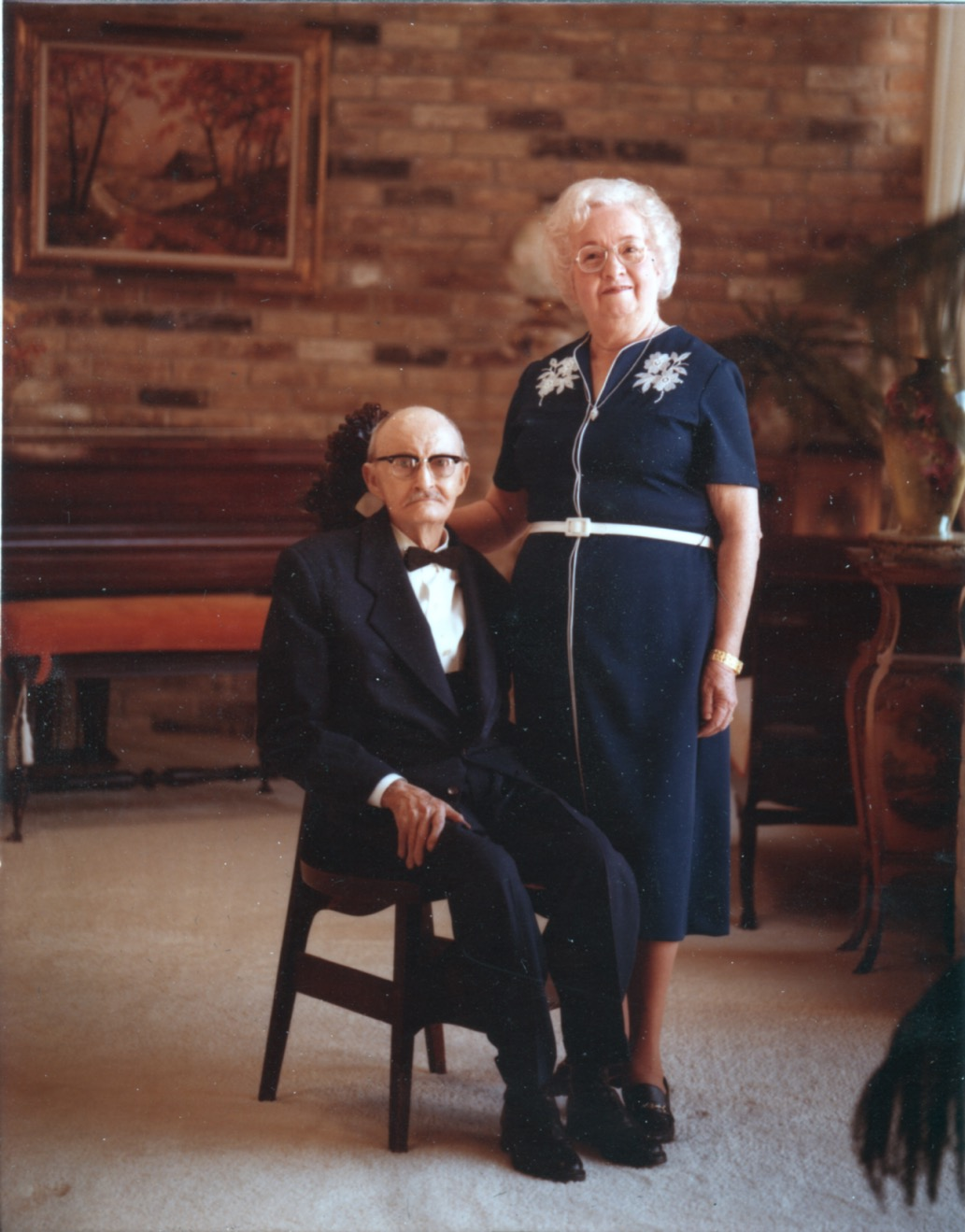
(1975) Venna Lee and Laurence Wilson

== Restoration ==
By the late 1970s, old East Dallas was on the decline, and Laurence Wilson's health was also failing. Wilson established several trusts with former Arlington Bank & Trust in Arlington, TX, which included the L.F. Wilson Charitable Trust, the L.F. Wilson Real Property Trust, and the L.F. Wilson Marital Trust. The real property trust included his family homestead and rental houses on Swiss Avenue. Laurence donated his Swiss Avenue property with stipulations that the transfer of any part of his father's original purchase be preserved as a historical site. The Wilson Trust executives worked in cooperation with Fox and Jacobs, real estate developers that were involved in the preservation and restoration of historic districts in Dallas.

In 1980, the Dallas Historic Preservation League (DHPL) raised money for their restoration efforts but they needed help. It was then that the Meadows Foundation became involved and acquired all of the Wilson Block except for the largest rental house known as the Arnold house which became DHPL headquarters. The Meadows Foundation established their offices in the original Wilson home at 2922 Swiss Avenue, and completed restoration of the block. They offered use of the homes rent-free to non-profit organizations under the conditions set forth in the transfer by Laurence Wilson. In 1982, the organizations that initially moved in were the Suicide and Crisis Center, Greater Dallas Council of Churches and the Center for Nonprofit Management.

== Expansion and preservation efforts ==
The Wilson House became the center of the Wilson Block Historic District which was expanded to include other Victorian houses from the area that were moved to Swiss Avenue and restored. The Meadows Foundation, in partnership with the City of Dallas, restored Central Square Park which holds historical significance as the second public park built in Dallas. It is located on the corner of Swiss Avenue and Oak Street. The Historic District also includes a few buildings and various facilities that were constructed by the Meadows Foundation for meetings and support purposes.

In 1993, the Meadows Foundation built a large facility near Swiss Avenue to house their headquarters. Shortly thereafter, and with help from the Meadows Foundation, the Historic Preservation League (HPL) moved its headquarters into the Wilson House. The following year, they changed their name to Preservation Dallas (PD), a nonprofit membership organization that focuses on protecting the history and culture of Dallas neighborhoods and historic buildings. They provide preservation services, research and conduct tours of the Wilson Block which is home to thirty-nine non-profit agencies that occupy rent-free office space in the district.

== See also ==
- National Register of Historic Places listings in Dallas County, Texas
- List of Dallas Landmarks
