= Cooperative Institute for Precipitation Systems =

University meteorological project

Coordinates: 38°38.2489′N 90°14.0579′W

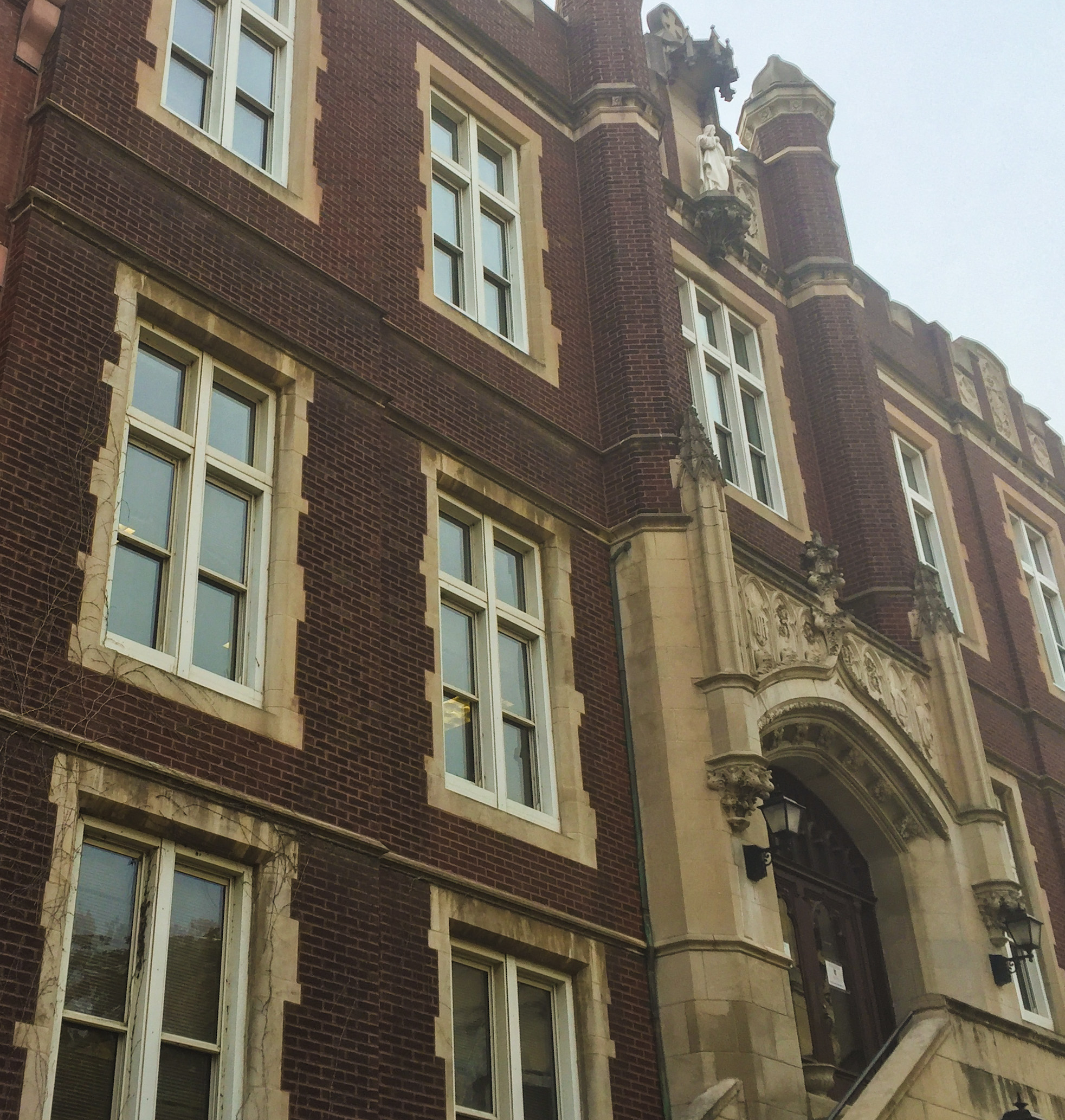
The location of the Cooperative Institute for Precipitation Systems

The Cooperative Institute for Precipitation Systems (CIPS) is a collaborative project headed by Saint Louis University to promote understanding of significant precipitation events. It originally focused on the Midwestern United States but expanded to include other areas, notably winter precipitation in the eastern U.S.

== Background ==
CIPS was formed in 2000 by the Department of Earth and Atmospheric Sciences in the College of Arts and Sciences at Saint Louis University (SLU). The noted synoptician and precipitation expert James T. Moore was a significant player in the formation of CIPS and an active principal investigator until his death. An original and significant collaborative partner is the National Weather Service St. Louis, Missouri, especially meteorologists Ron Przybylinski, Fred Glass, Jim Sieveking, and Gary Schmocker, but substantial and sustained collaboration also occurs with many other National Weather Service Forecast Offices (NWSFOs) throughout the U.S. as well as the Storm Prediction Center (SPC) and the Weather Prediction Center (WPC). Nearby partners include meteorologists from the 15th Operational Weather Squadron as well as television meteorologists.

CIPS information is published in various meteorological journals and presented at numerous AMS, NWA, and other conferences as well as at smaller seminars. Winter and warm-season precipitation workshops are held at SLU. Numerous graduate students have done research with CIPS, earning their M.S. and Ph.D. degrees in the process.

== Research ==
Research on snow-to-liquid ratios and climatology thereof, much of it by Martin Baxter, significantly advanced understanding of processes and contributed to improved weather forecasting of snow events. Winter storms are a major area of research focus for CIPS throughout its existence. Meteorological analogs utilizing numerical weather prediction (NWP) (such as the GFS and NAM models) combined with meteorological reanalysis are also a substantial area of research and the guidance data is heavily used by operational meteorologists in the NWS and media.
