= 1995 Texas Panhandle tornado outbreak =

- Clockwise from top: A radar loop showing several tornadic supercells across the Texas Panhandle on June 8 – A map of several tornadoes around McLean, Texas after damage surveys conducted by Project VORTEX – A large wedge tornado west of Allison being backlit by lightning.

Meteorological history
- Duration: June 8, 1995

Tornado outbreak
- Tornadoes: 29
- Max. rating: F4 tornado

Overall effects
- Fatalities: 0
- Injuries: 11
- Damage: > $30 million ($63.4 million in 2025)
- Areas affected: Texas Panhandle, Western Oklahoma
- Part of the Tornadoes of 1995

The 1995 Texas Panhandle tornado outbreak, alternatively known as the tornado outbreak of June 8, 1995, was a severe and localized outbreak that struck the Texas Panhandle and Western Oklahoma, on June 8, 1995. It is most well known for the tornado that hit Pampa, along with the Allison F4, the Kellerville F4, and the Hoover F2. Each of these tornadoes has sparked controversy over their rating, with many claiming that they had reached F5 intensity. In total, 29 tornadoes were recorded during that day, with 23 being in Western Oklahoma and the Texas Panhandle. One cyclic supercell in the Texas Panhandle produced at least 5 of those 23 tornadoes, while another spawned at least 8. There were 3 F4s, and the tornadoes caused 11 injuries.

== Meteorological synopsis ==
An unusually high dewpoint of 22-23C caused extremely high CAPE values of over 5000 J/kg. The environment supported supercells, and with a large amount of shear and curvature in the hodograph, supercell development was supported. These conditions lead to several tornadic supercells, which were studied by the VORTEX project.

== Confirmed tornadoes ==
All data are from NWS monthly storm data publication and NWS storm reports archive.

Confirmed tornadoes by Fujita rating
FU	F0	F1	F2	F3	F4	F5	Total
0	16	5	5	0	3	0	29

F#	Location	County and State	Start Time (UTC)	Path length	Max Width	Progression/Non-injury Effects	Injuries
F0	NE of Idaho Falls	Bonneville County, Idaho	2215	0.1 miles (0.16 km)	10 yd (9 m)	No damage was reported.	0
F1	Seligman to Eagle Rock	Barry County, Missouri	2104	12 miles (19.3 km)	250 yd (229 m)	This tornado went through Roaring River State Park, uprooted trees, and caused $100,000 ($211,291 in 2025) in damages by damaging nearly 100 camper-trailers.	3
F0	SE of Poplar Bluff	Butler County, Missouri	2252	0.25 miles (0.40 km)	50 yd (46 m)	Some trees were downed.	0
F0	Forsyth	Taney County, Missouri	0028	0.1 miles (0.16 km)	100 yd (91 m)		0
F1	Selman	Harper County, Oklahoma	2215	0.2 miles (0.32 km)	30 yd (27 m)	Caused $4000 ($8,452 in 2025) in damage.	1
F0	NNE of Shattuck	Ellis County, Oklahoma	0117	0.1 miles (0.16 km)	30 yd (27 m)		0
F2	NNE of Reydon	Roger Mills County, Oklahoma	0218	5 miles (8 km)	300 yd (274 m)	Caused $5000 ($10,565 in 2025) in damage.	0
F0	NE of Roxboro	Person County, North Carolina	2352	1.0 miles (1.6 km)	35 yd (32 m)	Some trees were downed.	0
F0	SSE of West Fork	Washington County, Arkansas	0020	0.1 miles (0.16 km)	30 yd (27 m)		0
F0	SSW of Pampa	Gray County, Texas	2127	0.1 miles (0.16 km)	50 yd (46 m)	First tornado produced by the Pampa supercell.	0
F4	Pampa	Gray County, Texas	2131	3 miles (4.8 km)	200 yd (183 m)	Second, and most destructive, tornado produced by the Pampa supercell (see also § Pampa, Texas)	7
F0	E of Pampa	Gray County, Texas	2150	0.3 miles (0.48 km)	100 yd (91 m)	Third tornado produced by the Pampa supercell.	0
F2	Hoover	Gray County, Texas	2150	6 miles (9.6 km)	400 yd (366 m)	Fourth tornado produced by the Pampa supercell. Caused $100,000 ($211,291 in 2025) in damage. This tornado passed close to the Rufe Jordan Unit. and stripped asphalt from roads.	0
F1	NW of Miami	Roberts County, Texas	2155	3 miles (4.8 km)	200 yd (183 m)		0
F1	NNE of Pampa	Gray County, Texas	2200	2 miles (3.2 km)	250 yd (229 m)		0
F0	S of Perryton	Ochiltree County, Texas	2215	1 mile (1.6 km)	73 yd (67 m)		0
F0	SW of Clarendon	Donley County, Texas	2219	2 miles (3.2 km)	100 yd (91 m)		0
F1	W of Miami	Roberts County, Texas	2235	10 miles (16 km)	250 yd (229 m)	Caused $300,000 ($633,872 in 2025) in damage.	0
F2	SW of McLean	Donley County, Texas	2255	10 miles (16 km)	500 yd (457 m)	First tornado produced by the McLean supercell. Rated as F3 by VORTEX.	0
F2	SW of McLean	Gray County, Texas	2259	4 miles (6.4 km)	300 yd (274 m)	Caused $100,000 ($211,291 in 2025) in damage.	0
F0	McLean	Gray County, Texas	2310	2 miles (3.2 km)	100 yd (91 m)		0
F2	SW of McLean	Gray County, Texas	2310	4 miles (0.16 km)	400 yd (366 m)	Second tornado produced by the McLean supercell.	0
F0	SW of McLean	Gray County, Texas	2321	1 miles (1.6 km)	50 yd (46 m)	Third tornado produced by the McLean supercell.	0
F4	N of McLean - NE of Mobeetie	Gray County, Texas, Wheeler County, Texas	2335	29 miles (46.7 km)	600 yd (550 m)	This is most well known as the Kellerville tornado. Winds exceeding 110 m/s (246 mph, 396 km/h) were recorded by Doppler radar. This was the fourth (and strongest) tornado produced by the McLean supercell. Caused over $10 million ($21.1 million in 2025) in damage to crops and other property. Several structures were damaged. Severe ground scouring occurred in rural areas. Rated as F5 by VORTEX.	0
F0	NW of Canadian	Hemphill County, Texas	2343	4 miles (6.4 km)	150 yd (137 m)		0
F0	WNW of Canadian	Roberts County, Texas	2353	0.5 miles (0.8 km)	50yd (46 m)		0
F0	N of McLean	Gray County, Texas	2355	0.1 miles (0.16 km)	10 yd (9 m)		0
F0	N of McLean	Gray County, Texas	2355	0.1 miles (0.16 km)	30 yd (27 m)		0
F4	SW of Allison - N of Allison	Wheeler County, Texas, Hemphill County, Texas	0045	15 miles (24.1 km)	2200 yd (2010 m)	This tornado was a large tornado, with some spotters reporting it as "one of the biggest and meanest tornadoes they had ever seen". It caused at least $2 million ($4.23 million in 2025) in damage. It killed at least 800 heads of livestock in Wheeler County. Despite every spotter report putting it as an F5, the NWS rated it an F4 due to lack of structural interactions.	0

=== Pampa, Texas ===
Pampa, Texas
- The tornado approaching Pampa

Meteorological history
- Formed: June 8, 1995, 4:27 p.m. CDT (UTC–05:00)
- Dissipated: June 8, 1995, 4:47 p.m. CDT (UTC−21:31)
- Duration: 20 minutes

F4 tornado
- on the Fujita scale
- Highest winds: 207–260 mph (333–418 km/h)

Overall effects
- Fatalities: 0
- Injuries: 7
- Damage: $30 million (1995 USD)

This extremely powerful but short lived F4 tornado formed near the city of Pampa, Texas, just after the parent storm produced an F0 tornado to the southwest. Despite only having a path 3 miles long, it caused 7 injuries, comprising a majority of the injuries caused by the outbreak. It also caused $30 million ($63.4 million in 2025) in damage as it travelled through Pampa before it lifted in the middle of the city. Per Thomas P. Grazulis, the F4 rating is based on movement of industrial equipment, as only F2-F3 damage occurred in Pampa because the tornado had weakened by then. In total, it destroyed 75 structures and damaged 175. Tornado expert Thomas P. Grazulis stated in F5–F6 Tornadoes; "In my opinion, if there ever was an F6 tornado caught on video, it was the Pampa, Texas tornado of 1995".

Photo of the Hoover, Texas F2 tornado taken by storm chaser Martin Lisius. Copyright Martin Lisius. The photo shows the Rufe Jordan Unit prison in front of the tornado.

After the tornado dissipated, the storm produced a short-lived F0 and the Hoover, Texas tornado, which was officially rated an F2 but some storm chasers argue it was stronger.

=== Kellerville, Texas ===
Kellerville, Texas
- The tornado during its stovepipe phase near the community of Wheeler, Texas.

Meteorological history
- Formed: June 8, 1995, 6:55 p.m. CDT (UTC–05:00)
- Dissipated: June 8, 1995, 7:30 p.m. CDT (UTC–05:00)
- Duration: 35 minutes

F4 tornado
- on the Fujita scale
- Highest winds: 260 mph (420 km/h)

Overall effects
- Fatalities: 0
- Injuries: 0
- Damage: $10 million (1995 USD)

This large and violent F4 tornado formed near the town of McLean, Texas at 6:55 p.m. local time. It was part of a tornado family, and was documented heavily by the VORTEX project.

The tornado's track then showed sinusoidal movement at the beginning of its life as it was near the small unincorporated community of Kellerville. In the town, there were two homes that were completely destroyed and another nearby that was severely damaged along County Line Road. The tornado continued northeast, tracking a few miles west to the city of Wheeler.

The tornado continued northeast, where it damaged several other homes and businesses in its path. The tornado then shifted in direction, moving northwest and began to weaken, decreasing in width. The tornado then lifted at 7:30 p.m. near the city of Mobeetie.

Severe damage to a residential area near the unincorporated community of Kellerville following the tornado.

== Non-tornadic effects ==
Several reports of large hail were made in Texas and Oklahoma, with the largest being 4.5 inches. The hail caused considerable damage, including denting some cars. Severe thunderstorms also moved through northern Oklahoma, causing straight-line wind damage(which caused one injury), lightning, and flash flooding. In the Texas Panhandle, wind damaged occurred to buildings and fences, and minor roof damage was reported from hail.

== See also ==
- Disagreements on the intensity of tornadoes
- Tornado outbreak sequence of May 6–27, 1995
