= Michael Buckley (professor) =

American academic

Michael P. Buckley is a former Clinical Professor and Director of the Property Repositioning Program at the University of Texas at Arlington. Before moving to Texas, Buckley directed Columbia University’s Master of Science in Real Estate Development Program.
