= Jennifer Thoreson =

Contemporary visual artist and photographer

Jennifer B. Thoreson, formerly Jennifer B. Hudson, is a contemporary visual artist and photographer. She incorporates mechanical and natural elements in sculpture, installation, costuming, makeup, and digital editing to create hauntingly beautiful images that address faith, spirituality, and the acceptance of one's self.

== Early life and education ==
Thoreson was born in 1979 in Weatherford, Texas. When she was still a child, her family moved to a small, conservative town in rural Texas where Thoreson spent her early years. She was raised extremely creative, and began to experiment with many things during her adult life. She graduated magna cum laude from the University of Texas at Arlington with her bachelor's degree in fine arts in 2001, and later went on to receive her masters in fine arts from the University of New Mexico in 2014. Since then she has taught at the University of New Mexico and the Santa Fe Photographic Workshops, as well as housing informal workshops, both in person and online, in Texas, California, Pennsylvania, and Nevada.

== Religious influence ==
Thoreson utilizes costuming and installation into her photographic works in order to create an ethereal, other-worldly experience. Her use of items that would usually be discarded further speaks to the spiritual and religious undertones that she implies. This re-purposing of the forgotten draws on the Christian beliefs of forgiveness, death, and life after death. The metal becomes an extension of the human form, and depicts both the fragility of life and the progress of mankind. She reminds the viewer that our own bodies function very similarly to machines and that, one day, we all become outdated, rust, and eventually advance. Placing a human subject alongside mechanical props in a natural setting makes it possible for Thoreson to explore mankind's relationship with machines, nature, and religion. These themes reoccur throughout all of Thoreson's images and serve as the underlying framework for her multiple photo series.

Pairing bits and pieces of strange objects, mostly things that are obsolete or even unidentifiable, wiring or taping them together, and observing them as new creatures allowed for discovery and creation of useful, repurposed beings. I feel like the machines take on a human quality themselves, as if there are two emotional subjects in the room forming a strange love relationship. The machines represent dependency, comfort, companionship, hope and restoration.

— Jennifer Thoreson

The photos also speak on the complications, joys, and interconnections of personal relationships with others and with oneself. Each photo is created and presented as a manifestation of Thoreson's personal experiences. The series Baptism, for example, has direct correlation to her childhood experiences in the Southern Baptist Church, while Medic draws upon a personal medical trauma. Thoreson strives for her work to be a reflection of her life, a collection of her memories. Every installation, costume, and sculpture she creates is symbolic. She assimilates the shapes of the human form, predominantly female, as surrogates for these memories and themes. She works closely with the models and positions their bodies in ways that seem both natural and unnatural, in the hope of fabricating a subject that is physical and metaphysical in one. In doing this, she hopes that the audience will view the photograph as an experience and not just an image.

== Body of work ==
Thoreson's six major photo series are Medic, Flora, Traveler, Baptism, Testament, and Coming of Age. Each one is meant to exemplify a different stage in her life and therefore, each series has a different tone and color scheme.

== Artistic style ==
Since her work is most concerned with portraying a message and telling a narrative, Thoreson's work fits into the genre of Conceptual/Fine-art photography most cleanly. Her inclusion of installment, staging, and editing creates images that almost resemble paintings and results in a mixed media piece. She takes elements of what is predominantly thought of as Fine Art, painting and sculpture, and applies it to photography. Her use of everyday objects borrows heavily from Marcel Duchamp and the concept of ready-made art, but her approach is significantly different.

== Awards and representation ==
Jennifer Thoreson's photographs have received positive reception and she has accepted many awards for her works, with the most recent being the Howard Franks Memorial Scholarship, which she accepted in 2013. Thoreson was named the Critical Mass Book Award Winner and was presented the ICP Leadership Award Medallion in 2011. She was awarded the Kodak Gallery Award nine times between 2004–2008, and the Fuji Masterpiece Award ten times also between 2004-2008. Thoreson is also now represented by four major galleries across the United States: Verve Gallery of Photography in Santa Fe, New Mexico, Panopticon Gallery in Boston, MA, JDC Gallery in San Diego, CA, and Klompching Gallery in New York, NY. Apart from the galleries, Thoreson's work has been showcased in many other exhibitions, as listed both below and on her official webpage.

== Exhibitions ==
=== 2010 ===
- Baptism, Verve Gallery of Photography, Santa Fe, NM
- Faith, Rayko Photo Center, San Francisco, CA
- Baptism, Zone Zero, ZoneZero.com
- Into the Light, Wallspace, Santa Barbara, CA

=== 2011 ===
- Medic, Gallery 1401, Philadelphia, PA
- Baptism, Red Filter Gallery, Lambertville, NJ
- Alternate Realities, Verve gallery of photography, Santa Fe, NM
- Critical Mass Exhibition, Traveling Exhibition
- Faith, SCA, Albuquerque, NM
- At First Sight, Gallery AC2, Albuquerque, NM
- 40th Anniversary Show, Panopticon Gallery, Boston, MA
- Processes and Dreams, Panopticon Gallery, Boston, MA
- Winter Salon, Klompching Gallery, Brooklyn, New York

=== 2012 ===
- The Diffusion Exhibition, Luz Gallery, Victoria, BC, Canada
- Medic, JDC Gallery, San Diego, CA
- The Finite Passing of Infinite Passion, SCA Gallery, Albuquerque, NM

=== 2013 ===
- Medic, Corden Potts Gallery, San Francisco, CA
- Away We Go, Harwood Arts Center, Albuquerque, NM
- UNM Juried Graduate Exhibition, Albuquerque, NM

=== 2014 ===
- The Diffusion Exhibition, Verve Gallery of Photography, Santa Fe, NM
- Who Is Magdalena, New Orleans, LA
- 21st Century Monochrome, Boston, MA

=== 2015 ===
- Losing Love, Denver, CO
- Close to the Heart, Laguna Beach, CA
- At The Walker, Garnett, KS
- Testament, Solo Exhibition, Gallery 76102, Fort Worth, TX
- Women’s Works, Woodstock, IL
- INSight Women’s Photography Exhibition, Albuquerque, NM
- ReGeneration 3, L’Ecole De L’Elysee, Lausanne, Switzerland
- String Along, Antenna Gallery, New Orleans, LA

== Selected Press ==
- 2023 Dec: ‘‘Musée Magazine’’, “Jennifer Thoreson”.
- 2020: Installation Magazine, Featured Artist, Los Angeles, CA.
- 2020: Infringe Magazine, Featured Portfolio, London, United Kingdom.
- 2017: Gente di Fotografia, Jennifer Thoreson, Dissonanza e Proliferazione, Modena, Italy.
- 2015: Larry Lytle, “Jennifer Thoreson’s Machines: The Better Angels of Our Nature?”, Black & White Magazine, UK.
