= Leslie R. Lemon =

American meteorologist (1947–2020)

Les Lemon
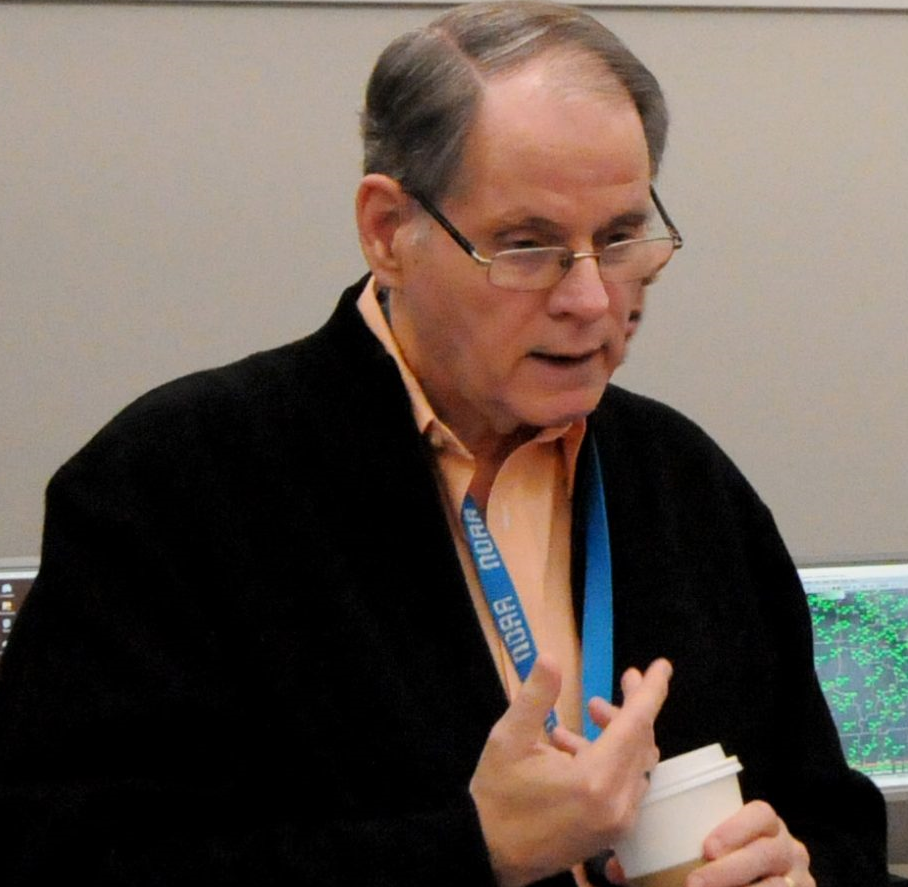
- Leslie R. Lemon in 2013.
- Born: January 19, 1947; Greenville, South Carolina
- Died: May 29, 2020 (aged 73); Independence, Missouri
- Education: University of Oklahoma
- Known for: Radar research and teaching on convective storms
- Scientific career
- Fields: Meteorology
- Workplaces: National Severe Storms Laboratory, NOAA Commissioned Corps, National Severe Storms Forecast Center, Lockheed Martin, Unisys, Basic Commerce & Industries, Paramax, Baron Services, WDTB/CIMMS, L.R. Lemon Meteorological Services
- Website: www.stormeyes.org/LRLemon/

Leslie R. Lemon (January 19, 1947 – May 29, 2020) was an American meteorologist bridging research and forecasting with expertise in weather radar, particularly regarding severe convective storms. Lemon was, along with Charles A. Doswell III, a seminal contributor to the modern conception of the supercell convective storm which was first identified by Keith Browning, and he developed the Lemon technique to estimate updraft strength and thunderstorm organization (in highly sheared environments) also as a continuation of Browning's work.

== Early life ==
Lemon's interest in severe storms was triggered in earnest after he witnessed the F5 Ruskin Heights tornado on May 20, 1957, which caused light damage to his family's home and severe damage very nearby. Lemon studied meteorology at the University of Kansas (KU) and the University of Oklahoma (OU), graduating with a B.S. from OU in 1970.

== Career ==
Lemon embarked on graduate school studies but it was during the Vietnam era so he wasn't able to continue, and he instead joined the NOAA Commissioned Corps. Afterward, in addition to developing the Lemon technique at the Techniques Development Unit (TDU) of the National Severe Storms Forecast Center (NSSFC) and his work on the supercell storm, Lemon was a major developer of the WSR-88D or "NEXRAD". In 1976 NOAA bestowed a Special Achievement Award for his co-discovery of tornado vortex signature (TVS). In tandem with developing new radar analysis concepts Lemon was early in integrating mesonet data from NSSL to connect what was occurring at the surface with radar depictions.

He later taught widely on the subjects of radar and severe convective storms throughout the United States and internationally, leaving the public sector to work at various companies. At Lockheed Martin, Lemon was a key developer of its microburst prediction radar. Lemon also worked at Unisys and other companies during his career and operated a forensic and consulting meteorology company.

Lemon was president of the National Weather Association (NWA) in 2001 and served on a National Academy of Sciences National Research Council (NAS NRC) committee on "Weather Radar Technology Beyond NEXRAD" that same year.

He was also an expert storm damage surveyor and surveyed the first documented tornado in Romania while doing radar work there.

== Death ==
Lemon died on May 29, 2020, at age 73.

== See also ==
- Donald W. Burgess
- Jon Davies
- Ron Przybylinski
- Terminal Doppler Weather Radar (TDWR)
- Low level windshear alert system (LLWAS)
