= StormStock =

American stock footage provider

StormStock is an American provider of stock footage focusing on weather and climate content. It was founded by filmmaker Martin Lisius in 1993 and is headquartered in Arlington, Texas. The brand shoots content on 4K, Super 35mm film, and 16K video. Topics include tornadoes, lightning, hurricanes, supercell thunderstorms, and climate change. StormStock footage is licensed for use in TV, film, commercials, and other video productions.

In 2005, the StormStock team, led by Martin Lisius, intercepted Hurricane Katrina and captured record-setting storm surge on Super 35mm film which was later transferred to 4K video. The StormStock collection includes footage of several F5 and EF5 tornadoes including the EF5 tornado that struck Moore, Oklahoma on May 20, 2013.

StormStock is known in the film and TV industry for shooting footage on leading formats and using innovative techniques. In 1998, Lisius began shooting weather and climate footage on Super 35mm motion picture film in preparation for HD video, which would not arrive as a standard format until about 2005. As soon as HD became the norm, the film footage was transferred to that format, allowing StormStock to have a seven-year head start in the weather and climate footage market. StormStock soon turned their attention to 4K and had another jump on that emerging format. In 2018, Lisius developed and built a 16K camera system, which he has used to capture content for StormStock.

StormStock has provided weather content for use in television series including "Wild Weather with Richard Hammond" for the BBC in 2014. In 2024, the Irish rock band U2 came to StormStock to license footage for their highly-successful “U2:UV Achtung Baby” concert series at the Sphere in Las Vegas which grossed $244.5 million in ticket sales.

Other productions utilizing StormStock footage include advertising for Chevy Trucks, BBC's "Planet Earth" series, and the Academy Award-winning documentary film "An Inconvenient Truth."

StormStock is a member of FOCAL International, a non-profit which represents footage and content libraries in over 30 countries.
