= Roger Edwards (meteorologist) =

American meteorologist

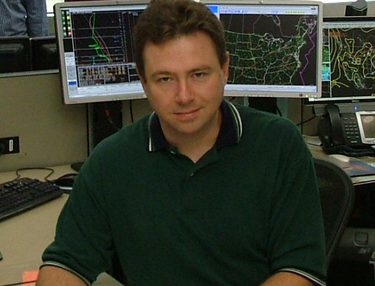
- Born: Dallas, Texas
- Education: University of Oklahoma
- Known for: Weather forecasting, storm chasing and ethical positions thereof, Electronic Journal of Severe Storms Meteorology
- Spouse: Elke (Ueblacker) Edwards
- Scientific career
- Fields: Meteorology
- Workplaces: National Hurricane Center, Storm Prediction Center
- Academic advisors: Charles A. Doswell III
- Website: www.stormeyes.org/tornado/

Roger Edwards is an American meteorologist and expert on severe convective storms (thunderstorms). He is the co-founder and editor-in-chief of the Electronic Journal of Severe Storms Meteorology (EJSSM).

== Biography ==
Edwards was born in Dallas, Texas and attended Woodrow Wilson High School. He earned a B.S. in meteorology from the University of Oklahoma (OU) in 1989 and worked as a meteorological aide at the National Severe Storms Laboratory (NSSL) as an undergraduate. Here he worked under the direction and mentorship of Don Burgess and participated in field research, including with the TOtable Tornado Observatory (TOTO) team. Edwards left graduate work at OU to accept a meteorologist position at the National Hurricane Center (NHC) where he worked from 1990 to 1993. He joined the National Severe Storms Forecast Center (NSSFC), now the Storm Prediction Center (SPC), in 1993, where he worked as a lead forecaster until his retirement on December 31, 2024. Thereafter, he joined the private consulting firm WeatherBELL in the section of Forensic Meteorology & Expert Witness Services.

Edwards is an expert and is outspoken on issues of weather forecasting, on public safety, particularly regarding tornado preparedness for large event venues, schools, and other large congregations of people, and on storm spotter training. He also has a research focus on tropical cyclone tornadoes. He has authored and co-authored as well as reviewed papers in American Meteorological Society (AMS) journals and conferences. With his expertise and emphasis on public outreach, Edwards is frequently interviewed by the media and is invited to speak at conferences across the country. He maintains the Online Tornado FAQ section at the SPC website. He is a storm chaser and is known for strong stances on storm chaser conduct and responsibility. He was a forecaster for Project VORTEX in 1994 and deployed mobile mesonet vehicles and in-situ probes for TWISTEX in 2008. Edwards was a contributor to Storm Track magazine and maintained the storm Storm Chase FAQ at its associated website. He co-founded with David M. Schultz and serves as editor-in-chief of the open access Electronic Journal of Severe Storms Meteorology. Edwards served for fives years as the Local Steward representing SPC for the National Weather Service Employees Organization (NWSEO).

Edwards is married to Elke (Ueblacker) Edwards and they have two children. Elke is also a storm chaser and photographer, and Roger enjoys travel, field geology, hiking, softball, gardening, and fishing.

== See also ==
- List of tropical cyclone-spawned tornadoes
