= Charles A. Doswell III =

American meteorologist (1945–2025)

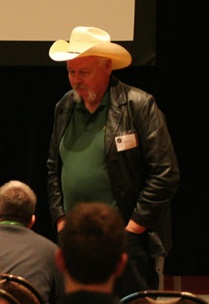
- Doswell in 2010
- Born: November 5, 1945; Elmhurst, Illinois, U.S.
- Died: January 18, 2025 (aged 79); Norman, Oklahoma, U.S.
- Education: University of Wisconsin–Madison; University of Oklahoma
- Known for: Research on thunderstorms and tornadoes
- Scientific career
- Fields: Meteorology
- Workplaces: National Severe Storms Forecast Center, Environmental Research Laboratories, National Severe Storms Laboratory, C. Doswell Enterprises
- Thesis: The Use of Filtered Surface Observations to Reveal Subsynoptic Scale Dynamics (1976)
- Doctoral advisor: Yoshi Kazu Sasaki
- Notable students: Roger Edwards; Richard Thompson

Charles (Chuck) A. Doswell III (November 5, 1945 – January 18, 2025) was an American meteorologist and thunderstorm researcher. Doswell was an influential contributor, along with Leslie R. Lemon, to the modern understanding of the supercell, which was developed originally by Keith Browning. He also advanced extensive research on forecasting methodologies and forecast verification, especially regarding severe thunderstorms, and was an advocate of ingredients-based forecasting.

== Life and career ==
=== Education and employment ===
Doswell was born on November 5, 1945. He did undergraduate school at the University of Wisconsin in Madison with meteorology as his major and obtained his B.Sc. in the spring of 1967. Doswell continued at the University of Oklahoma (OU), finishing a M. Sc. in January 1969. Doswell was called for military service in August 1969 and after basic training was assigned to the Atmospheric Sciences Laboratory at White Sands Missile Range, in New Mexico, for a study on fog modeling.

In 1972, he resumed graduate studies at OU, where he got a PhD in Meteorology in 1976. Having worked summers as a student at the National Severe Storms Forecast Center (NSSFC is now the Storm Prediction Center), in Kansas City, Missouri, Doswell was hired as a Research Forecaster at the Techniques Development Unit (TDU) of NSSFC. In 1982, he went to the Environmental Research Laboratories (ERL) Weather Research Program (WRP) in Boulder, Colorado, and then to the National Severe Storms Laboratory (NSSL) in Norman, Oklahoma in 1986. He retired from federal service in 2001 at which time joined the Cooperative Institute for Mesoscale Meteorological Studies (CIMMS) at the University of Oklahoma where he also continued to teach part-time.

He was a lead forecaster for the first project VORTEX in 1994/1995, produced more than 100 refereed publications, and several contributions to books and encyclopedias. He edited the American Meteorological Society (AMS) monograph Severe Convective Storms as well as co-authored two papers there.

=== Storm chasing ===
Doswell was among the first scientific storm chasers, and continued to chase recreationally later in life. He was a semi-professional photographer, with a special emphasis on storm photographs and also was a Certified Consulting Meteorologist (CCM). His professional storm chasing also included being a storm intercept tour guide as an expert lecturer. He spoke several times annually across the country, and occasionally internationally, to lay crowds to storm spotter seminars to storm chaser conventions to scientific conferences.

Doswell appeared in The Chasers of Tornado Alley (1996) along with friend and meteorologist Alan Moller. The award-winning documentary film about storm chasing, produced and directed by storm chaser and filmmaker Martin Lisius, follows Doswell and Moller as they intercept a powerful tornado in the small town of Pampa, Texas, on June 8, 1995. Doswell captured significant, up-close footage of the tornado which appeared in the film. His video of this tornado as well as other storm photos and videos appeared in several television shows and documentaries. He also contributed to storm spotter training materials and studied spotter history and instruction techniques.

He hosted the blues program Juke Joint and co-hosted, with Gene Rhoden and RJ Evans, a talk show program about severe storms, High Instability, both on the ShockNet internet radio station.

=== Death ===
Doswell died on January 18, 2025, at age 79, in Norman, Oklahoma. A memorial service was held at the National Weather Center (NWC).
