= Martin Lisius =

American filmmaker and storm chaser

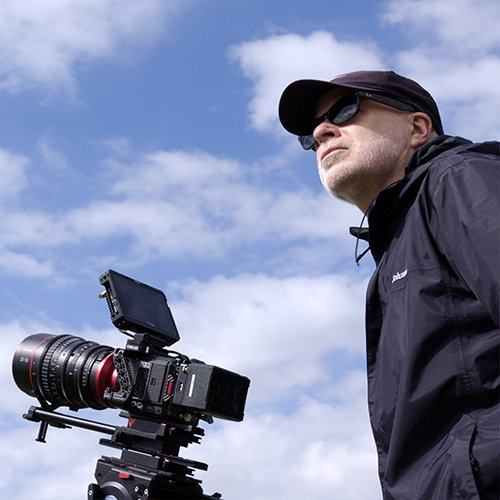

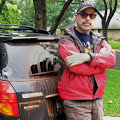
Martin Lisius after a storm chase in Texas, 2013.

Martin Lisius is an American filmmaker and storm chaser. He founded StormStock, a weather and climate stock footage collection, in 1993, and Tempest Tours, a storm chasing expedition company, in 2000. In 2018, he produced and directed the short film, Prairie Wind, among the first known 16K resolution videos to exist. In 1993, Lisius founded the Texas Severe Storms Association (TESSA), a non-profit whose mission is "to bring together both professional meteorologists and weather enthusiasts in an attempt to better understand dangerous storms through the collection and diffusion of knowledge." Lisius was a nominee for 2023 Footage Person of the Year, an award presented by FOCAL International. In 2024, he was elected to the FOCAL International Executive Board. FOCAL is a professional non-profit organization based in London, England which represents footage and content libraries, archive producers, researchers, consultants and facility companies in over 30 countries. Lisius was nominated again for FOCAL Footage Person of the Year in 2026.

Lisius is listed on the Notable Alumni web page for the Department of Communication at the University of Texas at Arlington.

As a filmmaker, Lisius has contributed content for use in productions for the Discovery Channel, Weather Channel, National Geographic Channel, and the Academy Award-winning "An Inconvenient Truth" (2006).

== Tempest Tours ==
In 2000, Lisius founded an experiential travel company called Tempest Tours. The company provides weather expeditions to paying guests. Expeditions take place in the US Great Plains region of Tornado Alley during the active spring storm season there. The company is staffed primarily by veterans including meteorologists and first responders. Research meteorologist Charles A. Doswell IIl was an early member of the staff working as a lecturer. Speaking on his reason for founding Tempest Tours, Lisius said, "By the 1990s I was conducting 30 to 40 chases per year and meeting other chasers. Soon I was speaking about severe weather and storm chasing at public venues, which resulted in requests from people wanting to chase. Their enthusiasm influenced me to establish Tempest Tours Storm Chasing Expeditions – a highly experienced team with a natural talent for forecasting and logistics. It was an opportunity to share our passion with others, and to teach."

== StormStock ==
StormStock is a collection of weather and climate stock footage and a brand of Prairies Pictures, Inc. that Lisius founded in 1993. Lisius and a staff of videographers track and film severe weather, such as hurricanes and tornadoes, and license the content for use in TV and film productions. As the primary cinematographer for his StormStock archive, Lisius said, “Storms are incredible to me. I share my appreciation for them through the way I film them. I see storms as an incredible part of nature, not as disasters. They are disasters only if people are not prepared for them. Given that, I feel they deserve to be explored and revealed in a beautiful, cinematic style.” Regarding the founding of the StormStock brand, Lisius said, “I had been shooting storm footage for several years, but I didn’t know that much about archiving content and licensing intellectual property,” Lisius recalls. “So, I contacted fellow producers for advice and did a lot of research, and quickly became a rights and clearances professional.”

== TESSA and Public Safety ==
Lisius founded the Texas Severe Storms Association (TESSA), a 501(c)3 non-profit, in 1993 to bring meteorologists and storm chasers together and help disseminate their information to the public. The concept of TESSA was developed by both Lisius and National Weather Service meteorologist Alan Moller who believed a private sector educational entity was needed. TESSA hosts the National Storm Conference where presentations about severe weather are presented by experts. In the 1990's, Moller asked Lisius to produce a storm spotter training video titled, "StormWatch." The project was a joint effort between TESSA, the National Weather Service and the Meadows Foundation in Dallas, Texas. The video was distributed to Weather Service offices nationwide to train local spotter groups.

As TESSA chairman, Lisius co-developed the DFW Tornado Scenario with National Weather Service Ft. Worth meteorologists Alan Moller, Gary Woodall, and Bill Bunting in 2000. Later, North Central Texas Council of Governments (NCTCOG) analyst Scott Rae created detailed versions of the scenario titled, Tornado Damage Risk Assessment. Their objective was to create scientific scenarios in which major tornadoes tracked through the Dallas-Ft. Worth Metroplex in order to be better prepared for those potentially catastrophic events.

On March 7, 2026, TESSA hosted its National Storm Conference at the University of Texas at Arlington (UTA). The UTA Office of Emergency Management co-hosted the event. Lisius delivered a presentation titled, "Guardians of The Universe" which revisited the DFW Tornado Scenario created in tandem with NCTCOG's Scott Rae.

Lisius published a book in 2014 titled, "The Ultimate Severe Weather Safety Guide." In the book, he states his purpose for writing it is to share what he has learned as a storm chaser to help others stay safe when severe weather threatens. Chapters include safety tips for tornadoes, lightning, hurricanes and flash flooding. Regarding the book, Lisius said, "I figured out long ago that tornadoes, hurricanes, blizzards and other storms are very survivable if these rules are followed. I wanted desperately to help other people, so I wrote this book with my guidelines. But, the book by itself cannot save lives. People who read it actually have to adhere to the rules."

In an attempt to demonstrate the danger of flying debris in a tornado, Lisius took some common household objects to the Debris Impact Facility at Texas Tech University in Lubbock to be launched by their pneumatic cannon in 2019. One object, a small handheld camera, became the fastest projectile to be tested at the facility reaching a speed of 264 mph.

== Quotes ==
"It all starts in the mind. I see images or a movie of the final product there. I gather the tools and make it happen."

"I find truth and purpose in nature. Being around it, and enveloped by it as often as possible, is important to me."

“Storms offer us a glimpse of what our world once was, and inspires us to protect and preserve what remains.”

“To do what I do, I have to not only be a skilled cinematographer, but I have to understand how to operate in and around storms safely."

== Filmography ==
In 1995, Lisius directed "StormWatch," a training video for the National Weather Service used nationwide to train storm spotter groups. Lisius co-produced the video with meteorologists Gary Woodall and Alan Moller. It was produced by the Texas Severe Storms Association with support from the Meadows Foundation of Dallas, Texas.

In 1996, Lisius wrote and directed "The Chasers of Tornado Alley," an early documentary film about storm chasing.

In 2018, Lisius shot a short film titled, "Prairie Wind" with a 16K video camera system he custom-built.

In 2024, Lisius wrote and directed "The Chasers of Tornado Alley: Touching the Sky," a sequel to the 1996 documentary about storm chasing. The film was shot on 4K and 16K video, and on Super 35mm motion picture film.

== Notable storm intercepts ==
- June 8, 1995 Pampa - Hoover, Texas tornadoes, F4-F5.
- May 30, 1998 Spencer, South Dakota Tornado, F4.
- Hurricane Katrina (Category 5) Mississippi - Louisiana coastal landfall, August 29, 1995.
- Hurricane Harvey, Southeast Texas, August 2017. Lisius' aerial footage of Hurricane Harvey appears in his short film, "Buffalo Bayou Rising," an official selection by the 2017 Flying Robot International Film Festival.
