= Storm spotting =

Form of weather spotting

Storm spotting is a form of weather spotting in which observers watch for the approach of severe weather, monitor its development and progression, and actively relay their findings to local authorities.

== History ==
Storm spotting developed in the United States during the early 1940s. A joint project between the military and the weather bureau saw the deployment of trained military and aviation lightning spotters in areas where ammunitions for the war were manufactured. During 1942, a serious tornado struck a key operations center in Oklahoma and another tornado on May 15, 1943, destroyed parts of the Fort Riley military base located in Kansas. After these two events and a string of other tornado outbreaks, spotter networks became commonplace, and it is estimated that there were over 200 networks by 1945. Their mandate had also changed to include reporting all types of active or severe weather; this included giving snow depth and other reports during the winter as well as fire reports in the summer, along with the more typical severe weather reports associated with thunderstorms. However, spotting was still mainly carried out by trained individuals in either the military, aviation, or law enforcement fields of service. It was not until 1947 that volunteer spotting, as it exists today, was born.

After a series of vicious tornado outbreaks hit the state of Texas in 1947, the state placed special emphasis on volunteer spotting, and the local weather offices began to offer basic training classes to the general public. Spotting required the delivery of timely information so that warnings could be issued as quickly as possible, thus civilian landline phone calls and amateur radio operators provided the most efficient and fastest means of communication. While phone lines were reliable to a degree, a common problem was the loss of service when an approaching storm damaged phone lines in its path. This eventually led to amateur radio becoming the predominant means of communication and resulted in the installation of special amateur radio work zones within local weather offices. Volunteer spotters would come into the local office and run a radio net from within, directly relaying information to meteorologists.

The 1950s saw the deployment of the first dedicated weather radars in the United States, and by this time, civilian spotter networks were commonplace. The new reflectivity-only radars provided meteorologists with basic information and helped identify potentially severe storms, but due to the nature of weather radar, most precipitation was detected at a height of 1 kilometer or more above the ground. Ultimately, the radar cannot see what exactly occurs at the surface of the earth, and storm spotters now correlated ground truthing with radar signatures. This early conventional radar showed intensity of echoes, inferring precipitation intensity and types, and the horizontal and vertical distributions provided information about storm structures and processes. The hook echo was a major method used as an indicator for potential for tornadic activity during the first decades of weather radar. During the 1990s in the US, Doppler weather radar was deployed, providing velocity data on echoes flowing toward and away from the radar location, which enabled inferences about storm rotation, such as mesocyclones, and other dynamics, as well as data on downbursts (and wind shear aloft). The 2010s brought polarization radar in the US, which enabled confirmation of the presence of stronger tornadoes by discerning nonmeteorological echoes colocated with rotation in velocity data, which indicates the presence of lofted debris. However, radar is still limited by factors such as not capturing near surface environment and limitations on spatial and temporal resolution. Therefore, ground truth information remains important.

New spotter technologies and training techniques have been developing since the 1960s. Prior to the 1960s, the vast majority of amateur radio communication relied on AM-modulated signals and the use of simplex. It was not uncommon for spotters to hear the distant net control station and not hear other mobile or base stations which were much closer. After 1960, amateurs adopted the use of FM repeaters which operated in the VHF spectrum. The use of FM repeaters was a huge advancement for storm spotters; spotters could now hear each other regularly. The low noise floor and greatly improved audio quality meant much better signal reception for all stations. By the 1970s, nearly all spotter radio activity consisted of half-duplex FM repeater use. The next major technology to aid spotters was the development of the cell phone in the late 1970s and early 1980s. It was then possible for non-amateur radio operators to directly report severe weather.

Storm spotting became more popular with the public during the late 1980s and early 1990s. During this period, a number of NSSL (National Severe Storms Laboratory) projects were carried out, some of which were documented and broadcast on television in a number of specials. Spotters and their actions were believed to have saved lives while also aiding university research groups, which dropped sensors such as TOTO in the path of tornadoes and at times fired rocketsondes directly at or very close to tornadoes. At about the same time, early storm chasers were popularized and associated with spotters. It is believed this association is what has led many in the present era to associate storm chasers and storm spotters as carrying out the same actions or having the same goals.

== Present ==
Technological advances such as the Internet, weather radio, pagers, and cell phones have made spotter activation quick and efficient; however, the basic goal of spotting has remained relatively unchanged to this day. In making these reports, spotters use a specialized set of jargon and slang to describe their observations.

The primary group responsible for storm spotting in the U.S. is known as Skywarn. Many individuals hold Skywarn certification and/or amateur radio licenses. Other spotters are part of organized and highly trained local spotter groups, reporting their observations to the local emergency management office or National Weather Service office responsible for that area. A Skywarn group is either directly or indirectly affiliated or associated with the local weather office, and in many cases other agencies responsible for the well-being of individuals. Today, amateur radio still plays a key role, as most spotters opt to attain their radio licenses; however, cell phones are an ever increasingly popular means to directly relay information, along with other on-line spotter reporting protocols such as The Spotter Network.

Other spotters groups have formed in various countries. Canwarn is the Canadian spotter program run by Environment Canada and similarly the Australian Bureau of Meteorology runs the ASP (Australian Storm Spotters) program in Australia. In the United Kingdom, the TORRO has operated a network of observers since the 1970s. Since the 2000s, about a dozen European countries (including the UK) have operated autonomous storm-spotting organizations under the auspices of Skywarn Europe.

Countries in Asia such as Malaysia introduced a Community Service Oriented application called 'RakanMET' which allows volunteer public weather reports/spotting and two-way communication between the public and the Meteorology Department of Malaysia with the live weather report using Global Positioning System (GPS) from the reporter's smartphone. Such service allows better information sharing especially during monsoon seasons as storms are a lot more frequent.

== Risks ==
While there is no question that storm spotting has saved many lives and aided weather agencies greatly, there is concern that storm spotting may actually put individuals in danger. It is a common practice for many spotters to leave their vehicles or places of shelter to better observe, but this also places spotters in a situation where they can be harmed or killed by lightning. Most spotting groups do not recommend that individuals leave their vehicles or places of safety.

== Storm spotters versus storm chasers ==
A storm spotter is volunteer or a paid county or municipal employee who is spotting as a community service. Most spotters work as part of an organized network and are in communication with their community or organization, which is in turn in communication with the National Weather Service. The purpose of spotting is to alert community officials and the NWS and assist them in warning the public. Schools, hospitals, and other facilities are encouraged to have spotters to alert people in their care of impending severe weather.

Most trained storm spotters in the US are volunteer HAM radio operators that are organized by the National Weather Service and local emergency management groups. Sometimes, police, fire, security and other safety personnel can act as spotters.

By contrast, storm chasing involves following a developing thunderstorm to view or photograph severe weather phenomena. Chasing may be done for educational purposes or scientific research but is mostly done for personal fulfillment.

The main difference between the two is storm spotters 'warn,' while storm chasers 'track.'

A person can be a storm spotter, a storm chaser, or both.

== Training ==
The US National Weather Service developed an organized storm spotter training system starting in the 1970's. Meteorologist Alan Moller played a significant role in the development of the effort. He believed that storm spotters are a vital part of the Integrated Warning System since they provide "ground truth verification" for forecasters. Moller developed Tornadoes: A Spotter's Guide (1977) and latter co-produced the "StormWatch" storm spotter training video in 1995 with meteorologist Gary Woodall and Texas Severe Storms Association (TESSA) chairman Martin Lisius. In 2001, TESSA began offering the Super Storm Spotter Training Session at its National Storm Conference. The session was created by Woodall to offer training that extended beyond the Weather Service's "basic" and "advanced" training. Training focuses primarily on the various weather elements storm spotters witness in the field including properly identifying tornadoes, wall clouds and other storm features.

The National Weather Service organizes in-person training sessions for storm spotters throughout the US. These often take place at a public venue such as a school or government building. Presentations usually include slide presentations and video. These sessions are free and open to the public for anyone wanting to become a spotter.

== Severe weather warnings ==
Some county spotter groups have regular over-the-air meetings using a local HAM radio frequency. This usually takes place on the same radio frequency used by the spotters during a severe weather event. The frequency connects spotters in the field to a network controller who relays reports to a Weather Service forecaster. Sometimes, the forecaster asks for only reports that exceed a certain severe threshold such as hail reports of a specific size or larger. If a forecaster thinks the storm may have immediate tornado potential, they will ask the spotters to relay only tornado and funnel cloud reports, or reports of rapid, low-level cloud base rotation. The forecaster will consider the spotter reports along with radar, local conditions, and sometimes live video feeds, to determine if a warning should be released to the public. If a warning is released, it will be sent to various outlets including social media, TV and radio broadcasters, and local emergency managers. The goal is to deliver accurate warnings to the public as quickly as possible.

== See also ==
- Citizen Weather Observer Program (CWOP)
- Convective storm detection
- Local storm report
