= Rufe Jordan Unit =

State prison in Pampa, Texas, US

Coordinates: 35°33′59″N 100°53′17″W

- Interactive map of Rufe Jordan Unit
- Location: 1992 Helton Road Pampa, Texas
- Status: open
- Security class: G1, G2, G4, Transient
- Capacity: 1008
- Opened: October 1992
- Managed by: Texas Department of Criminal Justice

The Rufe Jordan Unit is a state prison for men located in Pampa, Gray County, Texas, owned by operated by the Texas Department of Criminal Justice. This facility was opened in October 1992, and has a maximum capacity of 1008 male inmates held at various security levels.
