= The Meadows Foundation (Dallas) =

Nonprofit organization in Dallas, United States

The Meadows Foundation is located at 3003 Swiss Avenue in the Wilson Historic District in Dallas, TX., and was incorporated as a private philanthropic institution in 1948 by Virginia and Algur H. Meadows. The purpose of the foundation is "to benefit the people of Texas", and their mission is "to assist the people and institutions of Texas improve the quality and circumstances of life for themselves and future generations." The foundation has distributed "more than $1.1 billion in grants and direct charitable expenditures to more than 2,000 Texas institutions and agencies."

== History ==
In the 1930s, Algur Meadows built General American Oil Company of Texas, a Delaware company headquartered in Dallas, into one of the nation's largest independent oil and gas production companies. The company had amassed refineries, oil fields, and gas plants across the nation before it sold to Phillips Petroleum Company in 1983. Al Meadows survived the Great Depression, and became a wealthy oilman through his investments. He and Virginia were quite generous with their wealth, and during their lifetime, had donated to many charitable causes. They wanted to continue the gift of giving in perpetuity, and in 1948, chartered the Meadows Foundation to be operated "under the guidance and direction of family members and trusted advisors.".
