= Greensburg tornado =

2007 tornado in southwest Kansas, United States

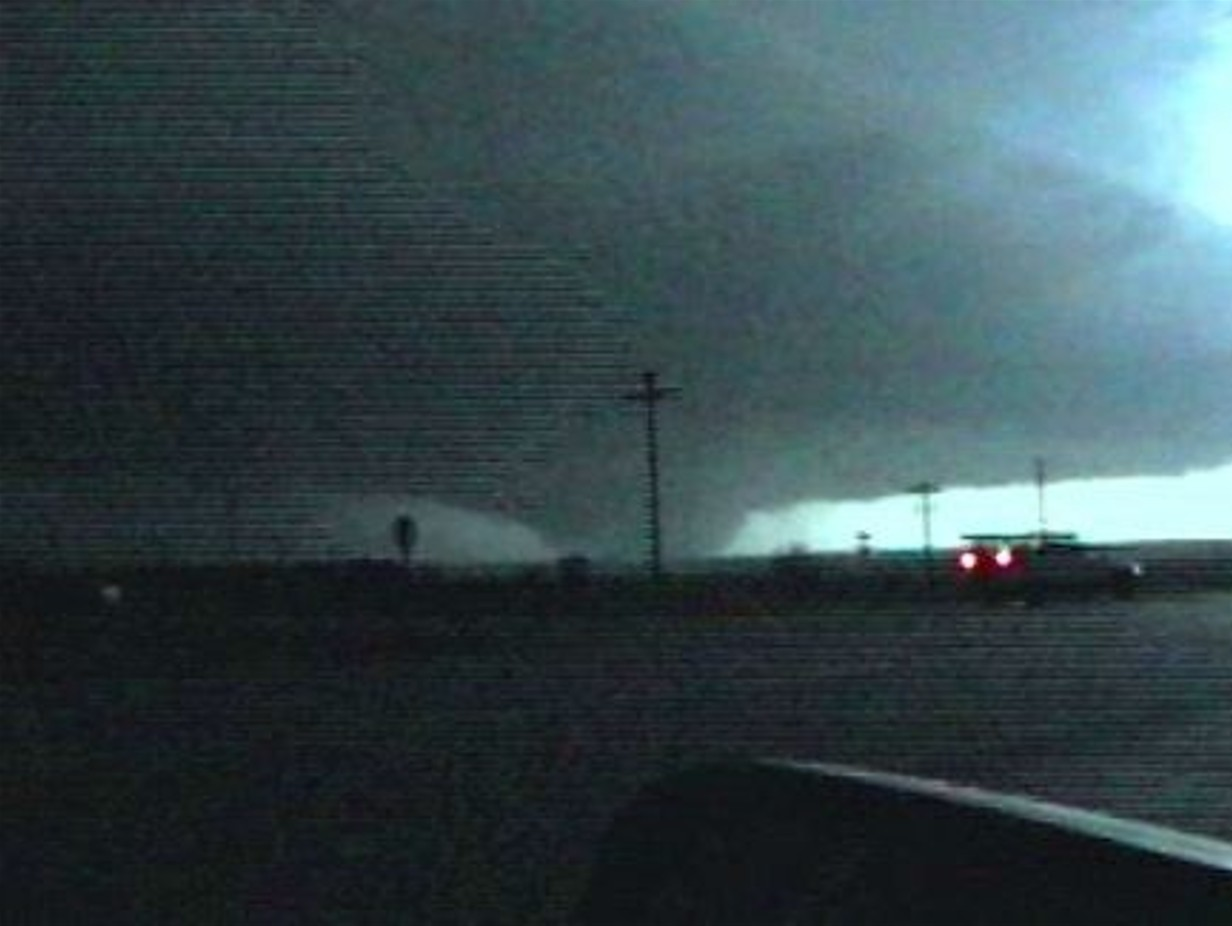
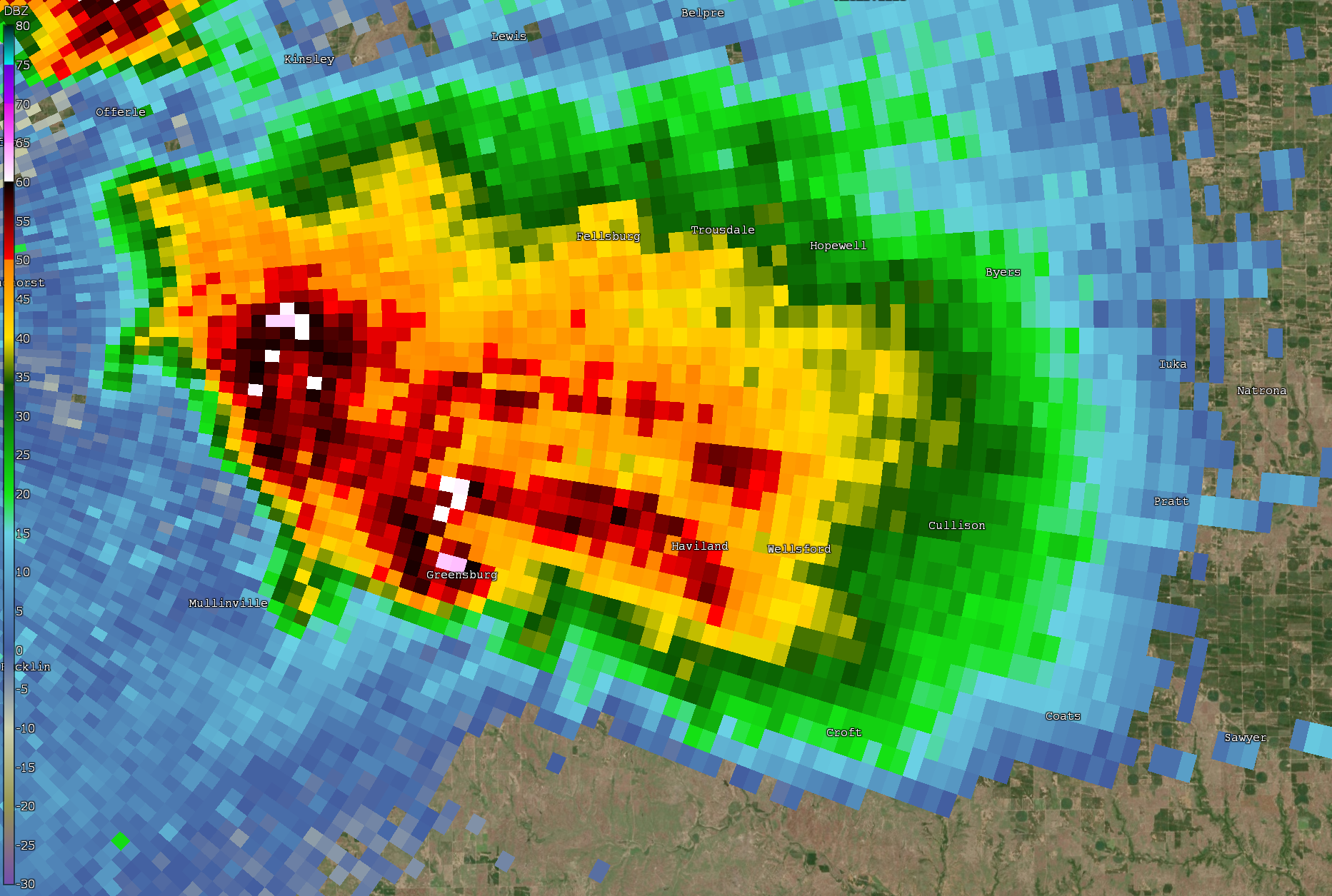
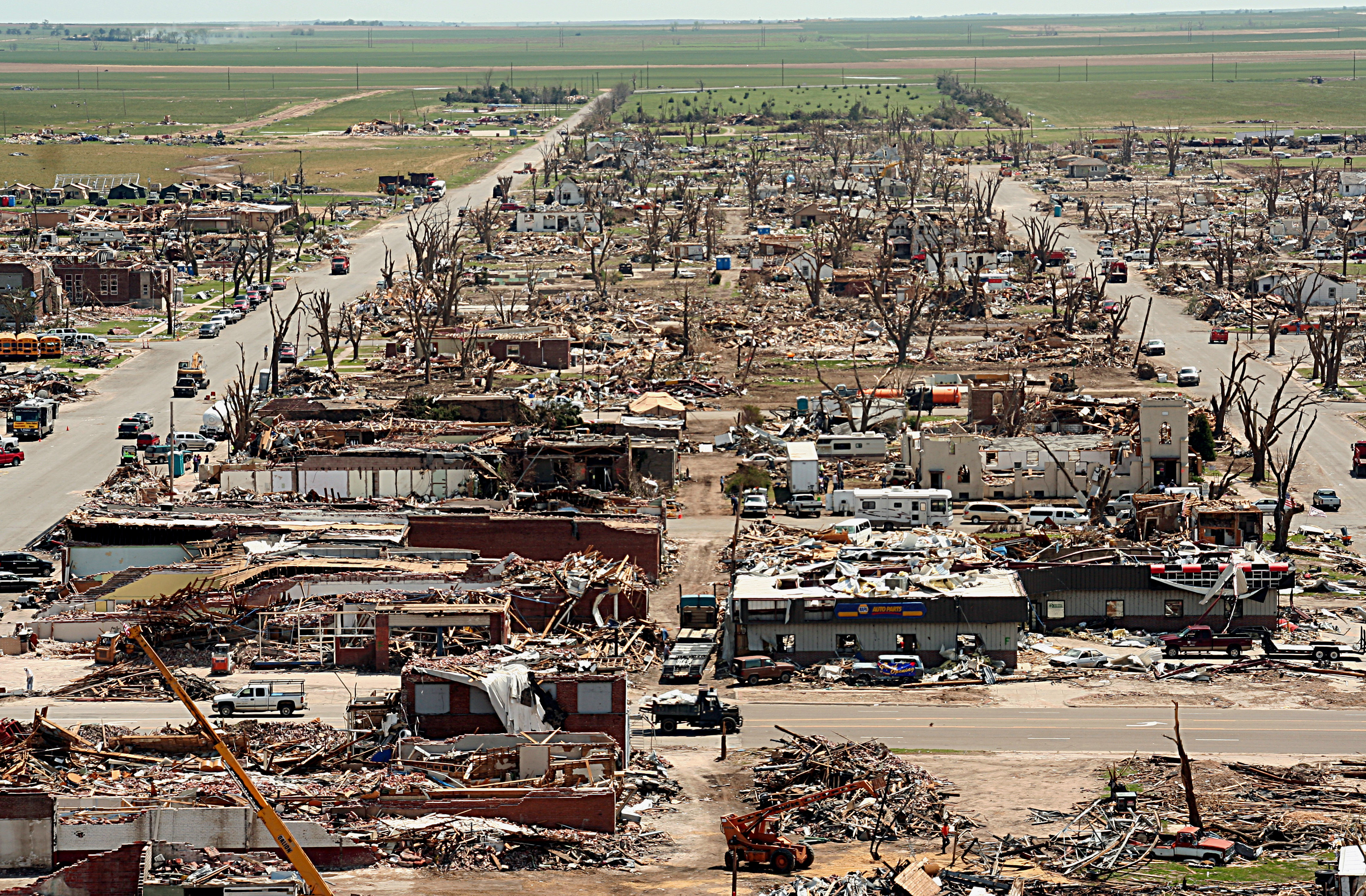
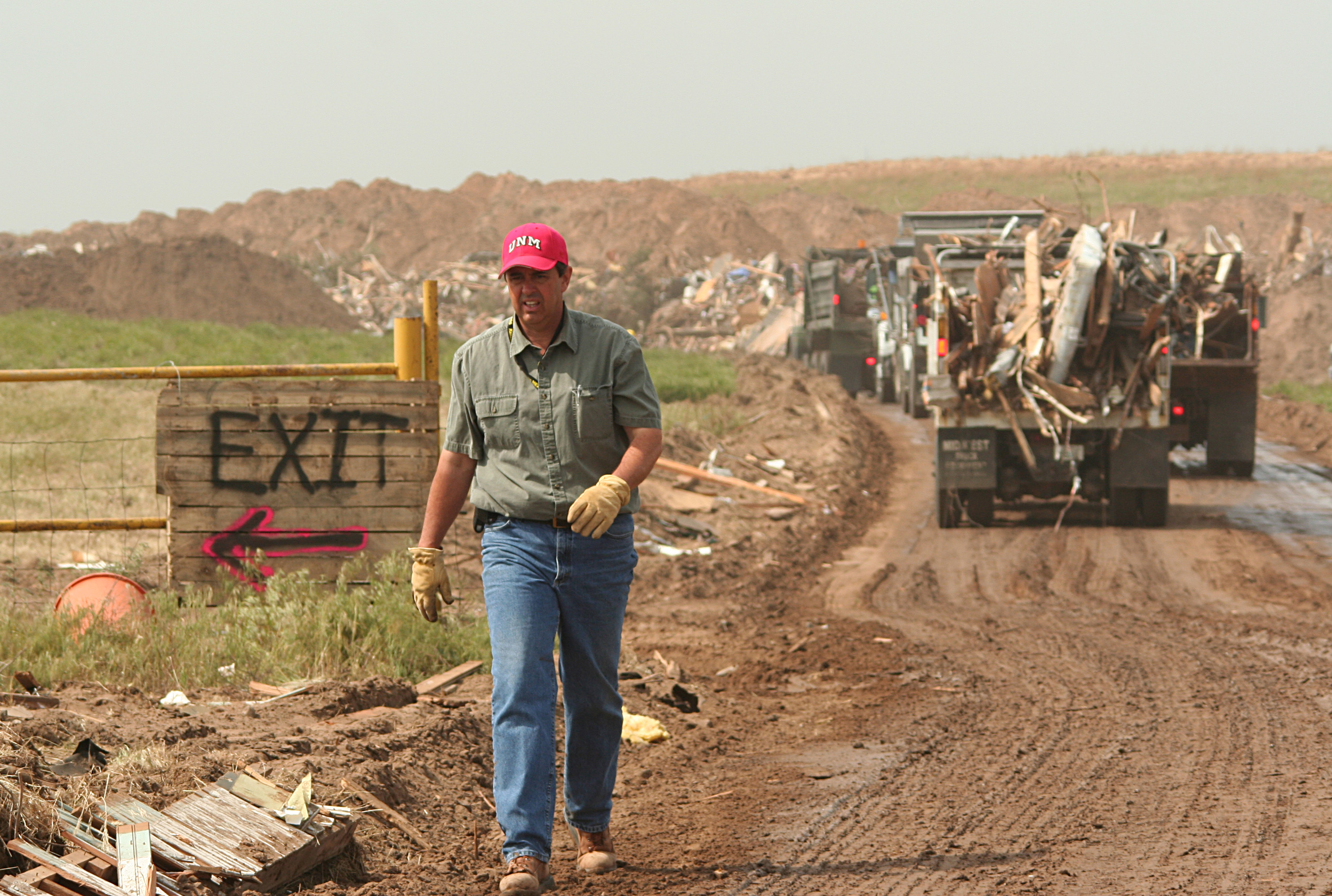
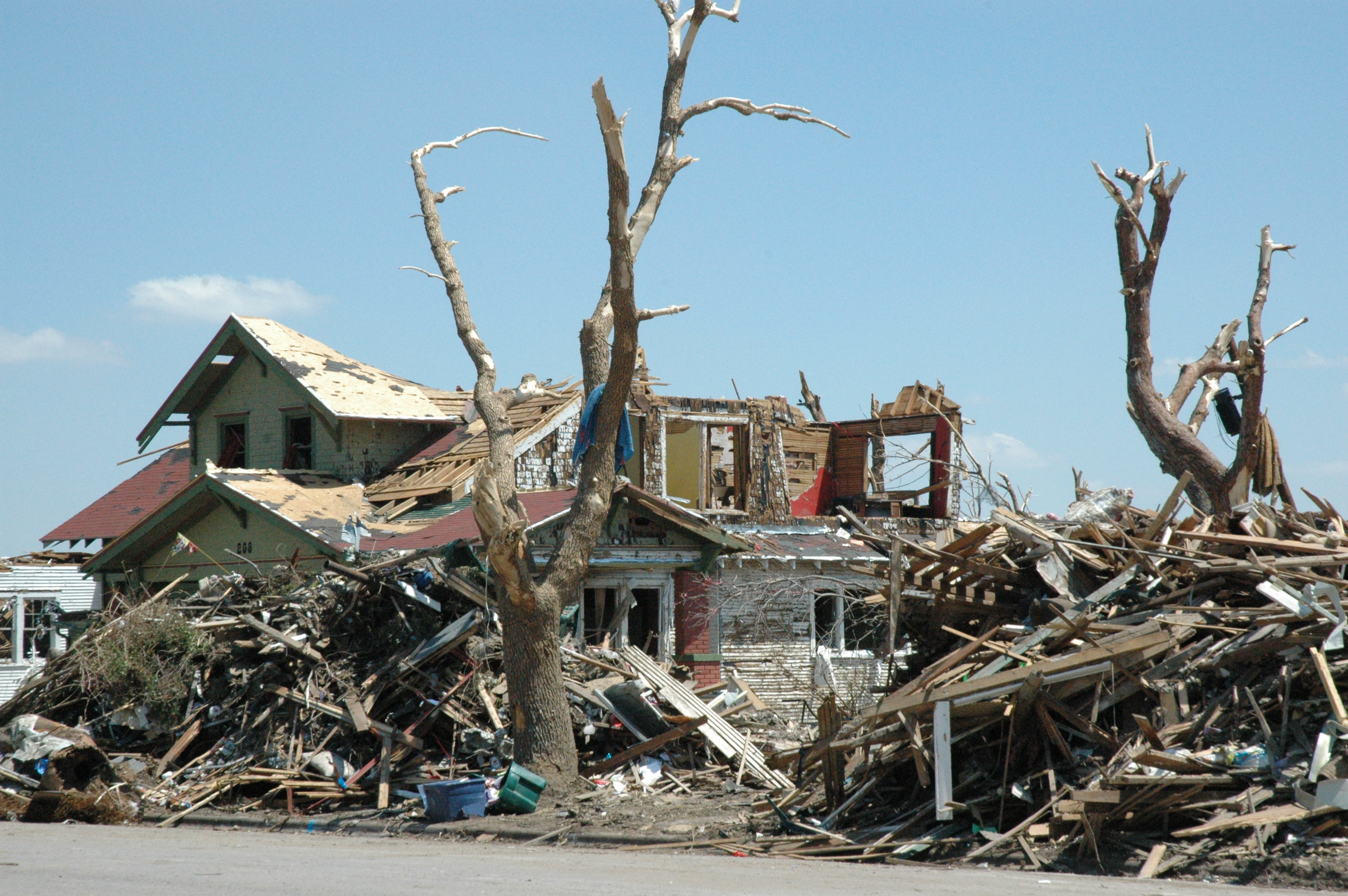
- Clockwise from top: A photo of the tornado taken from Highway 148, damage to downtown Greensburg, which took a direct hit from the tornado, a heavily damaged house in Greensburg, workers helping cleanup efforts in Greensburg, radar imagery of the supercell thunderstorm that produced the tornado, marked by a debris ball

Meteorological history
- Formed: May 4, 2007, 9:03 p.m. CDT (UTC−05:00)
- Dissipated: May 4, 2007, 10:05 p.m. CDT (UTC−05:00)
- Duration: 1 hour, 2 minutes

EF5 tornado
- on the Enhanced Fujita scale
- Max width: 3,000 yards (1.7 mi; 2.7 km)
- Path length: 28.8 miles (46.3 km)
- Highest winds: 205 mph (330 km/h)

Satellite tornadoes
- Tornadoes: 5
- Max. rating: EF1 tornado

Overall effects
- Fatalities: 10–13 Fatality estimates: 10 - Per KBAK-TV; 11 - Per the National Weather Service, Marshall et al. 2008; 12 – Per Ablah et al. 2013, The Parkersburg News and Sentinel; 13 - Per The Kansas Reflector
- Injuries: 63
- Damage: 95% of Greensburg damaged or destroyed
- Economic losses: $250 million (2007 USD) $402 million (2026 USD)
- Areas affected: Greensburg, Kansas, US
- Part of the Tornado outbreak of May 4–6, 2007 and Tornadoes of 2007

In the evening hours of Friday, May 4, 2007, amid a severe weather outbreak across the central United States, a massive and violent tornado moved through Kiowa County in southwest Kansas, before impacting the city of Greensburg and causing widespread devastation. The tornado, known as the Greensburg tornado, tracked 28.8 miles (46.3 km) through the area, killing 10 to 13 people and injuring 63. The tornado was the first to be rated EF5 on the Enhanced Fujita scale after the retirement of the original Fujita scale in the United States on February 1, 2007.

The tornado touched down south of Greensburg at around 9:03 p.m. CDT, (Note: Unless noted otherwise, all times in the article are in Central Daylight Time.) moving to the north while continuing to widen. It eventually entered Kiowa County, crossing U.S. Route 183, before reaching a peak width of 1.7 miles (2.7 km) to the south of Greensburg, entering the city after making a northwest turn. The tornado dissipated northwest of Greensburg after being on the ground for just over an hour.

Approximately 95% percent of the city was damaged or destroyed, with some form of damage to 662 structures, and monetary losses of $250 million (2007 USD). (Note: Unless noted otherwise, all damage totals in the article are in 2007-adjusted U.S. Dollars.) Kiowa County, in which Greensburg is located, was declared a federal disaster area in the immediate aftermath. Rebuilding efforts were intensive, and several major federal government agencies collaborated with state agencies to help restore the city with the goal of making it a "green town" using a long-term community recovery (LTCR) plan. The plan included requiring all buildings in Greensburg to gain Leadership in Energy and Environmental Design Platinum (LEED platinum) certification, the highest rating a building can achieve in the LEED program by utilizing sustainable design in energy, along with installing wind turbines in the city. The Kiowa County Memorial Hospital, which was destroyed by the tornado, was the first hospital in the United States to achieve carbon neutrality following its rebuilding in 2010.

The tornado greatly affected the economy and population of Greensburg. The city has difficulty attracting residents due to the cost of homes in the area, although it has become a point of interest among eco-tourists visiting to see the "green town" built by the Federal Emergency Management Agency's LTCR plan.

== Climatological background ==
Map of F5 and EF5 tornadoes recorded in the United States from 1950 to 2019

Tornadoes are common in the state of Kansas, with an average of 87 tornadoes touching down per year. Kansas sees the second-highest number of tornadoes within its state-boundaries in an average year, behind only Texas, which sees 124 on average. Kansas is located in the center of Tornado Alley, the region of the United States in which the most tornadoes occur. Cold and dry air from the Rocky Mountains and the West Coast of the United States drops into Tornado Alley, while moist subtropical air is pulled inward from the Gulf of Mexico. The cold air pushes under the warm and moist air, pushing it upward; this updraft leads to the development of thunderstorms capable of producing strong tornadoes.

Kansas has experienced seven F5 or EF5 tornadoes since 1950, the highest number recorded in any U.S. state. Research conducted by meteorologist and tornado historian Thomas P. Grazulis concluded that F5-rated tornadoes have struck Kansas since 1895. Kansas has had an estimated 4.4 tornadoes per 100 square miles (260 km^{2}) since 1950, the third-highest frequency in the nation, after Oklahoma and Florida.

== Meteorological synopses ==
=== Forecasting ===
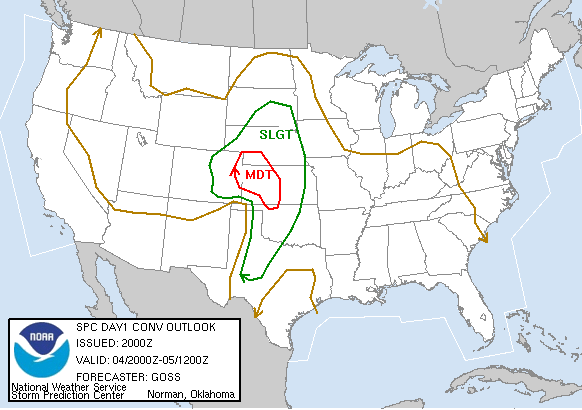
The 2000z (3:00 p.m.) convective outlook, outlined by the Storm Prediction Center on May 4

The Storm Prediction Center (SPC), the agency responsible for outlining convective outlooks for weather in the United States, first hinted at a severe weather event on April 30, when a large area was denoted across much of the Great Plains where severe weather would be possible from May 3–7. The Day 3 convective outlook introduced a "slight" risk across western Kansas, Nebraska, and a small portion of northern Oklahoma. It was exclaimed in the outlook that "new TSTM (Note: In meteorology, "TSTM" is an abbreviation for thunderstorms.) development will be likely along dryline with activity becoming supercellular as ascent spreads NEWD with four corners impulse". The Day 2 convective outlook maintained the "slight" risk, while introducing a 30% probability of significant severe weather across the Great Plains, including western Kansas.

The Day 1 convective outlook added a "moderate" risk for much of Kansas and southern Nebraska. The risk was driven by a 15% "hatched" (Note: In meteorology, "hatching" indicated areas where significant severe weather (EF2+ tornadoes, 2"+ hail, 75+ mph winds) were possible. The traditional hatching pattern was discontinued by the Storm Prediction Center in 2026.) tornado risk, 30% wind risk, and a large 45% hail risk. The outlook noted that "while degree of instability suggests that large hail will be a primary concern...locally-damaging winds and isolated tornadoes can also be expected. Greatest tornado threat appears to extend from central KS NNWWD toward SWRN NEB...where backed low-level flow is supporting the greatest low-level shear."

At 5:15 p.m. a tornado watch was issued by the SPC including much of northern Texas, Oklahoma and southern Kansas.The watch was accompanied by a 50% chance of two or more tornadoes within the watch area and a 30% chance that a tornado in the watch area would be of EF2+ intensity.

=== Mesoscale synopsis ===
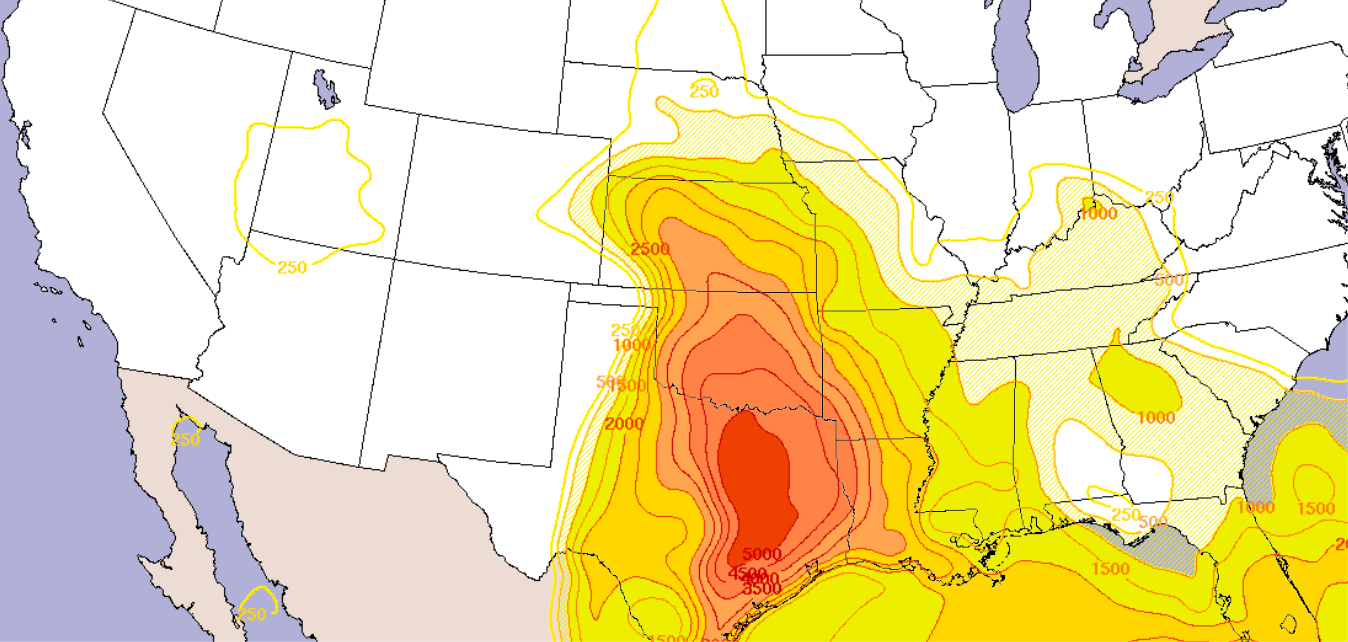
SBCAPE values at 2100z (4:00 p.m.) on May 4

The environment around the convective risk area on May 4 was highly conducive for the development of severe thunderstorms, with a dryline being extant from the Texas panhandle to southwest Kansas. The first thunderstorms developed along the dryline at 5:30 p.m. near the Texas panhandle, with convection moving northeast as more thunderstorms within a cluster developed and later moved into southern Kansas. From then till around 8:00 p.m. the storms struggled to become supercellular, although a cell within the cluster rapidly strengthened while moving through Clark County, Kansas. The cells combined into one supercell near U.S. Route 183. 60°F dewpoints were being transported into the cell through its inflow region, providing an opportunity for the cell to rapidly strengthened as it tracked northeast. Further observations revealed that the inflow region was housing extreme levels of instability, with convective available potential energy (CAPE) values of 5,100 J/kg$^{-1}$ being documented.

The first indications of a mesocyclone associated with the cell became present on the KDDC WSR-88D radar site's velocity scan at 7:50 p.m., and 8 minutes later a bounded weak echo region had become visible on the storm's northern flank. Other mesocyclones were also observed on radar, with two notable BWERs within the cell developing; one was associated with the main mesocyclone that produced the Greensburg tornado. At around 8:30 p.m., storm spotters began reporting wall clouds (cloud formations typically occurring at the base of thunderstorms). The first two tornadoes spawned by the cell were photographed at 8:34 p.m., with two more tornadoes occurring within the next 13 minutes.

At 9:25 p.m., a well-defined hook echo, a radar signature often indicative of a mesocyclone within a thunderstorm, was located in southern Kiowa County. This hook echo was accompanied by the Greensburg tornado, which touched down at 9:03 p.m. south of Greensburg.

== Tornado summary ==
=== Formation and track towards Greensburg ===
The rotating supercell that later produced the Greensburg tornado was accompanied by several short-tracked tornadoes. The Greensburg tornado itself, located on the westernmost side of the mesocyclone, began to rapidly strengthen shortly after touching down at 9:03 p.m.

NOAA Weather Radio audio of the tornado warning that was issued for Kiowa County at 9:19 p.m.

As the main tornado continued through rural areas, oil tanks were destroyed, with oil strewn across pastures and a road. The very large tornado continued to grow in size as it approached the city of Greensburg from the south. The tornado then reached its maximum width of 1.7 miles (2.7 km) as determined by damage, nearly the size of Greensburg itself. At 9:41 p.m., the National Weather Service office in Dodge City issued a tornado emergency for Greensburg, stating that "a violent tornado was on a direct path for portions of Greensburg ... this is an emergency situation for Greensburg".

=== Impact in Greensburg ===
Reflectivity (left) and velocity (right) imagery taken by a NEXRAD radar of the tornado, indicated as a purple and later red triangle approaching Greensburg from the south before dissipating. The storm then rapidly produced another extremely large tornado northeast of Greensburg, also indicated by a triangle. These triangles mark the strong tornado vortex signatures visible in the velocity imagery. A distinct hook echo is visible in the reflectivity imagery.

The tornado weakened slightly as it entered residential areas in southern Greensburg, but remained violent, at EF4 intensity, as it directly struck Delmer Day Elementary School, completely leveling a section of the building. Continuing north, the tornado completely devastated downtown Greensburg; the Greensburg City Hall and many other businesses suffered visible damage, including Fleener's Furniture Store, Dillon's Grocery Store, and Sutton's True Value Hardware Store. A motel on the west side of the city was severely damaged and vehicles were rolled and lofted by the tornado. A Daylight Donuts coffee shop and the local bank were heavily damaged or destroyed by the tornado. Three schools were destroyed and electrical service to the city was cut by the tornado.

A large grain elevator in the northern part of Greensburg remained standing after being hit by the tornado, one of a few structures to survive the event. The Greensburg meteorite was found and recovered under a wall in the building which had previously housed it. The Greensburg Mennonite Church was also destroyed. Trees throughout the city were completely stripped of all bark, the greatest number of debarked trees being located near houses that sustained EF4 damage. EF5 damage was determined to have been inflicted to seven residences throughout Greensburg proper.

A damage survey conducted by Timothy P. Marshall, Joshua Wurman, and several other experts found that a total of 53 houses had slid off brick foundations that anchored the homes to the ground. 194 homes sustained EF0 damage; many of these homes were located along the outer path of the tornado on the east and west side of the city. The survey also concluded that damage on the tornado's east side was more severe than damage of that on its west side.

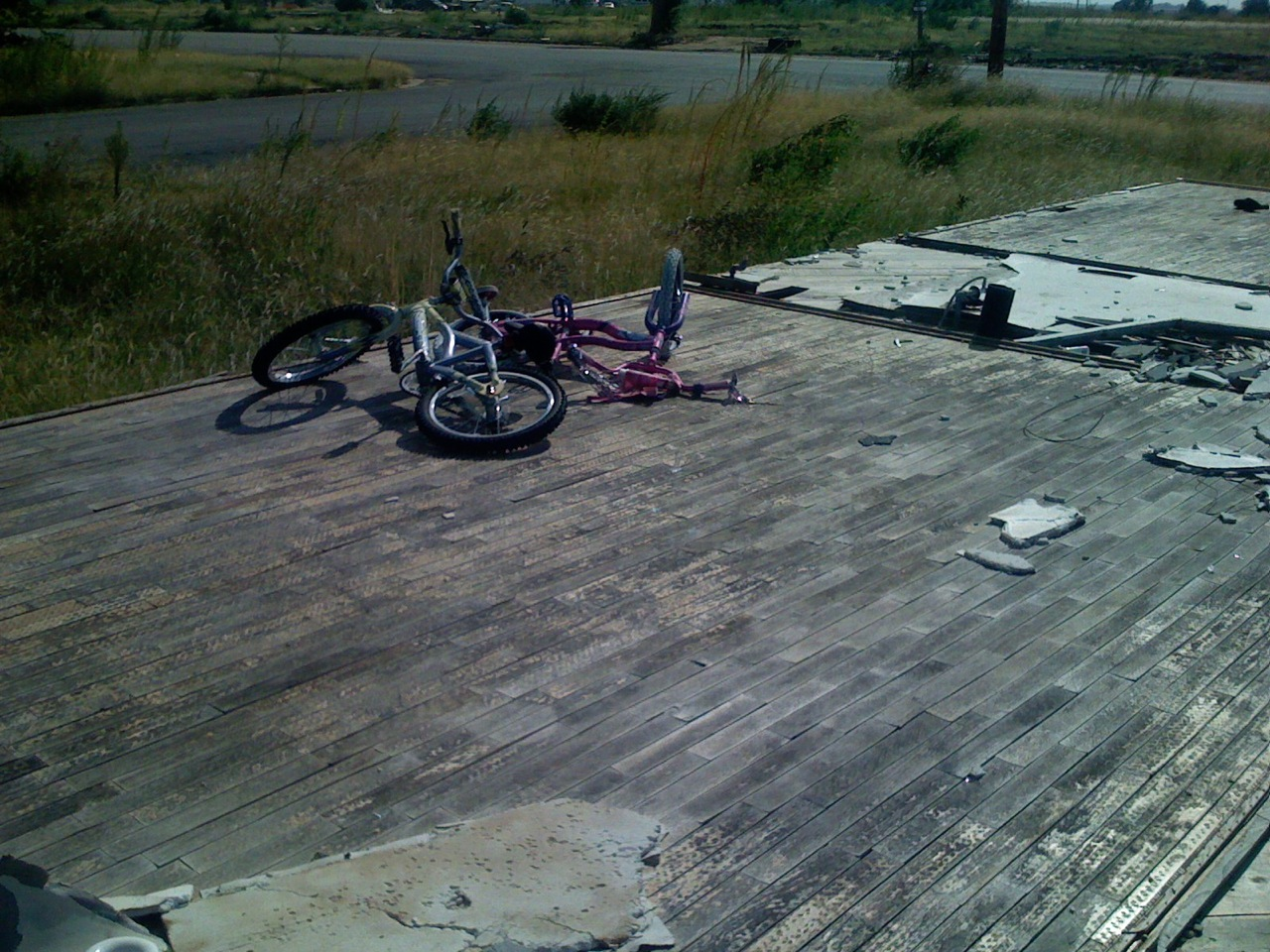
The foundation of a home destroyed by the tornado

As the tornado exited the city limits of Greensburg, it began to weaken. It turned to the northwest, tracking in a counterclockwise circular direction; the tornado dissipated in a farm field to the northwest of Greensburg at 10:05 p.m.; it had been on the ground for one hour and two minutes. Overall, 95% of Greensburg was damaged or destroyed. A total of 961 homes and businesses were destroyed, 216 received major damage and 307 received minor damage. The National Weather Service rated the worst of the damage caused by the tornado at EF5 on the Enhanced Fujita Scale (EF scale), which is used to rate and assess tornado damage. The tornado was the first to be rated EF5 on the EF scale after the retirement of the original Fujita scale in the United States on February 1, 2007; an EF5 rating is determined via a tornado damage survey. The tornado was described by meteorologist Howard Bluestein as "likely the most intense since the tornado that struck Oklahoma City and Moore, Oklahoma, on 3 May 1999". The Greensburg tornado was followed by multiple other tornadoes that night across southern Kansas, although none struck heavily-populated areas and inflicted damage to the degree that was observed in Greensburg. At 11:10 p.m. the SPC noted that "the strong...long-lived tornadic supercell NW of Pratt KS continues to move just to the right of the mean flow with calculated 0-1 km SRH of over 400 m$^2$/s$^2$".

Due to the time of day as well as the parent supercell's rain-wrapped nature, few photos exist of the tornado itself.

=== Satellite tornadoes ===
During the early stages of the tornado's life, videos and later research showed that at least five confirmed satellite tornadoes existed around the main tornado. Two of these satellites were anticyclonic tornadoes, which rotate clockwise instead of the counter-clockwise motion that most tornadoes in the Northern Hemisphere exhibit. A University of Massachusetts team, observing the storm using a mobile radar system, detected five satellites that were determined to have been related to the Greensburg tornado. One of these satellite tornadoes likely crossed over the same damage path produced by the main tornado. The largest satellite tornado was located around 1.85 miles (3.0 km) southeast of the main tornado.

List of confirmed satellites of the Greensburg tornado - May 4, 2007
EF#	Time (CDT)	Path length	Max width of path
EF1	8:10 p.m.	~1.3 miles (2.1 kilometres)	~151 feet (46 metres)
EF0	8:18 p.m.	~0.19 miles (0.31 kilometres)	~74 feet (23 metres)
EF0	8:18 p.m.	~0.19 miles (0.31 kilometres)	~74 feet (23 metres)
EF0	8:25 p.m.	~0.31 miles (0.50 kilometres)	~118 feet (36 metres)
EF0	8:25 p.m.	~0.5 miles (0.80 kilometres)	~118 feet (36 metres)

=== Coverage and warnings ===
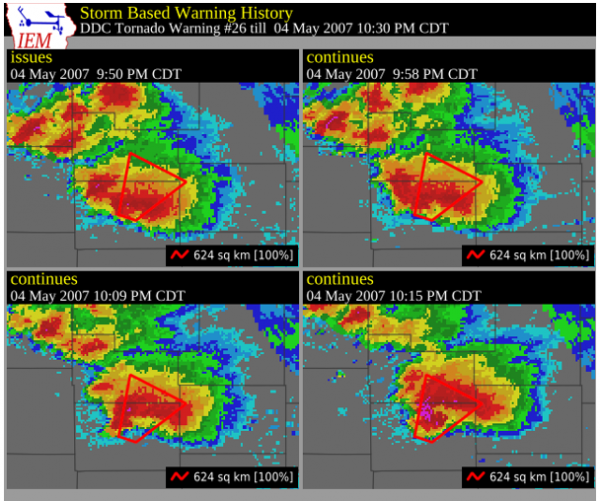
The tornado warning, seen as a red polygon, that was issued for Greensburg before the tornado struck the city

The National Weather Service issued advance warnings of the tornado that were sent out to the public up to 39 minutes before the tornado hit Greensburg. The warnings were upgraded to a rare tornado emergency 10 to 12 minutes before the tornado hit; storm chaser Lance Ferguson had relayed to the National Weather Service that a large tornado was on the ground near Greensburg. NBC News noted that some Greensburg residents said the warnings saved their lives and that more people may have died had the warnings not been issued so far in advance, as the warnings gave time for residents to move to their shelters before the tornado destroyed the city. Sirens sounded in Greensburg 20 minutes before the tornado entered town, although four of them were destroyed in the tornado.

Jay Prater covered the storm for the KAKEland Television Network, while Dave Freeman broadcast coverage on KSN. One survivor of the tornado stated that Freeman's coverage had saved his life, and several survivors took shelter because of the broadcast. Freeman was praised for his live coverage of the event and as a result was named as the National Weather Association's Broadcaster of the Year for 2008, his second time winning the award after receiving it in 1992.

== Aftermath ==
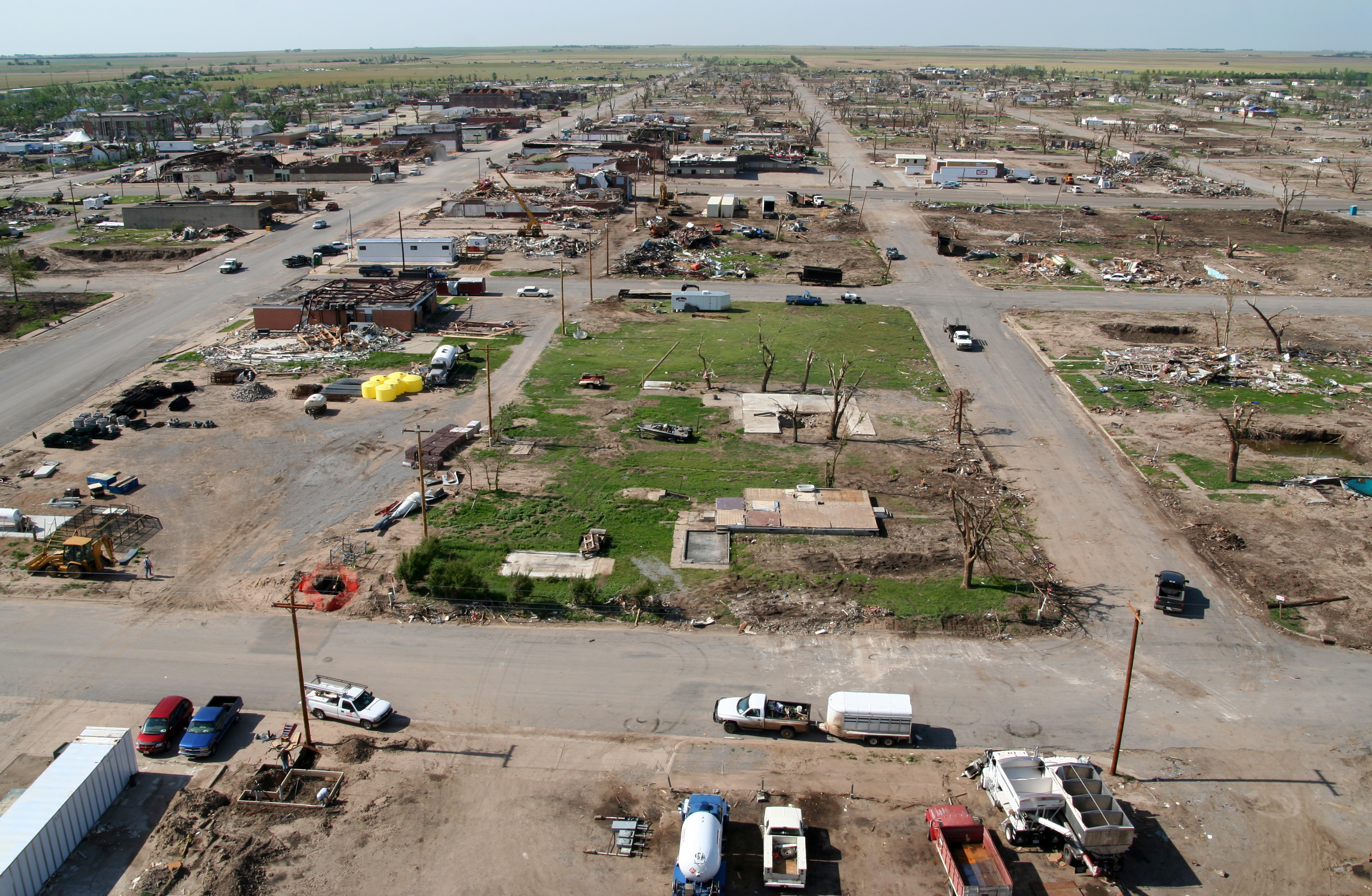
Damage to downtown Greensburg a month after the tornado

95% of structures in Greensburg were damaged or destroyed. Around 800,000 cubic yards (610,000 m^{3}) of tornado-related debris was removed from Greensburg from 2007 to April 2008. Initial recovery attempts in the days following the tornado were constrained by the disruption of electricity and by other hazardous conditions that made it difficult to clean up the city. President George W. Bush declared a disaster area in the state of Kansas. Immediately after the tornado, the Environmental Protection Agency (EPA) dispatched on-scene coordinators to Greensburg; the agency was tasked with addressing fuel releases and mitigating damaged transformers. The EPA left Greensburg in June 2007, a little over a month after the tornado, although it remained on standby. Over 500 families were left homeless due to the storm.

Shortly after the event, a Quick Response Team with the National Weather Service office in Dodge City, Kansas, was dispatched to survey and rate tornado damage as applied on the Enhanced Fujita scale. It was determined that the tornado inflicted EF4-level damage at the Delmer Day Elementary School and Greensburg High School. Following further analysis, including the construction of the Kiowa County Memorial Hospital and multiple other homes in Greensburg, surveyors rated the tornado as an EF5 with peak wind speeds between 200 to 210 miles per hour (320 to 340 km/h). Meteorologists Leslie Lemon and Mike Umscheid later noted that the tornado was "probably" stronger than the Joplin, Missouri EF5 tornado in 2011 and was comparable in strength to the 2011 Hackleburg–Phil Campbell, Alabama EF5 tornado that same year.

The town's economy was still affected by the tornado ten years after the event; it has seen trouble attracting residents because of homes being sold in Greensburg at higher prices than those in neighboring towns. According to a 2015 study, "24 businesses were critically damaged by the tornado, and 110 were damaged beyond repair".

=== 5.4.7 Arts Center ===
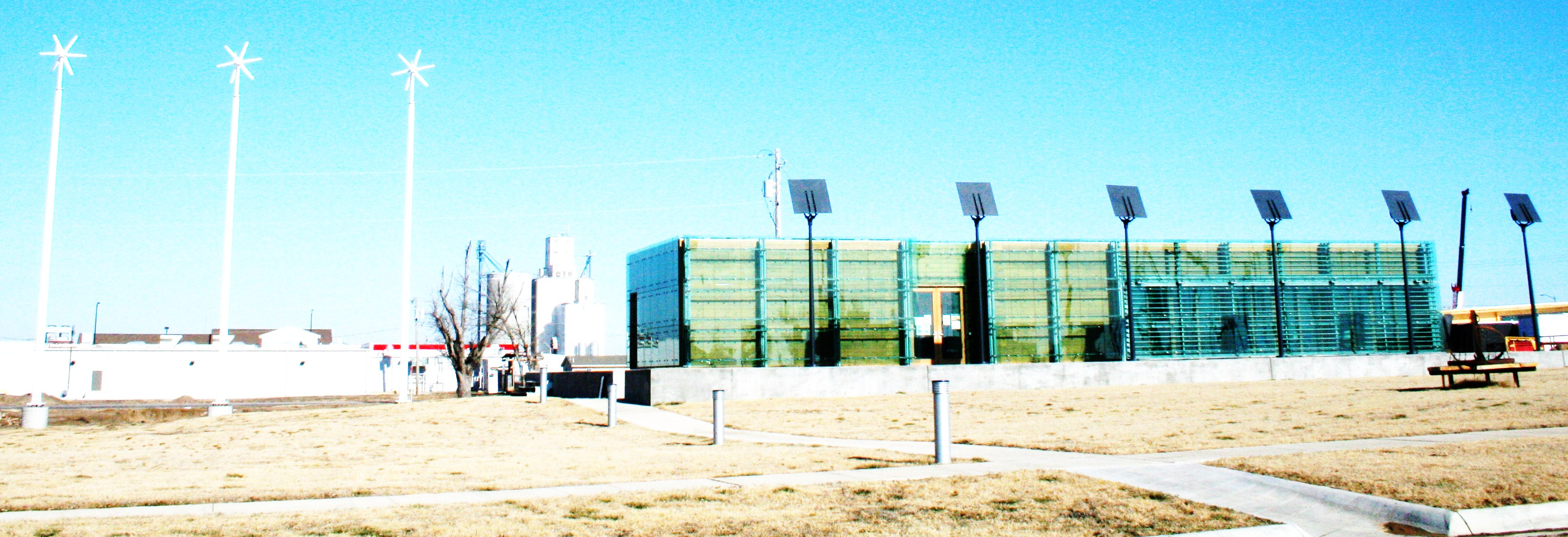
The 5.4.7 Arts Center, seen in 2009

The 5.4.7 Arts Center, named after the date the tornado occurred, opened on June 16, 2008, and is the first sustainable LEED-platinum building in the state of Kansas and the first in history to be built by students. The building's wood siding was sourced from the World War II-era Sunflower Army Ammunition Plant in eastern Kansas. During a 2010-2011 study by the United States Department of Energy, it was found that the building saved 70% in energy costs compared to typical buildings of its type.

=== Delmer Day Elementary School and Greensburg High School ===
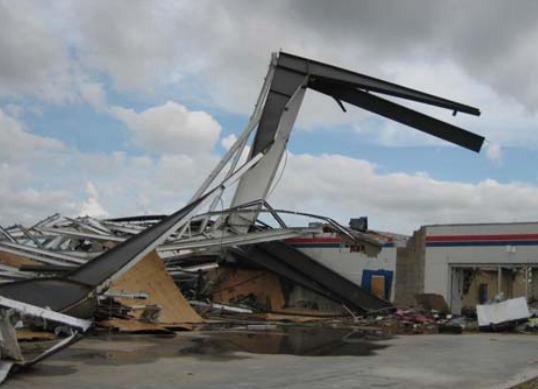
EF4-rated damage to the Delmer Day Elementary School, located in southeastern Greensburg

Greensburg High School, located around one block east of the tornado's inflow, was heavily damaged. As the tornado moved through the area, northward-facing winds battered the building, causing the top floor of the main building and the southern wall of an adjacent building to collapse inward. The east-facing walls of the high school also collapsed inward; the west-facing walls collapsed in an outward direction due to the movement of wind. In a damage survey conducted after the tornado, it was found that the building's large window sills anchored by hinge lines were unable to hold up against high winds, resulting in the collapse. Damage to the high school received an EF4 rating.

Delmer Day Elementary School, located in the southeast portion of Greensburg, was the subject of an in-depth damage survey, which detailed how the school collapsed. Similarly to the Greensburg High School, strong winds initiated a collapse on the school's south- and east-facing walls. A lack of steel vertical columns along the school's window sills, accompanied by weak hinge lines, was concluded to have led to the collapse. Like the high school, damage inflicted to the school was eventually given an EF4 rating.

Both Greensburg High School and Delmer Day Elementary School were so heavily damaged that they were no longer usable as public education facilities for Greensburg; school was canceled for the remainder of the calendar school year as a result. Schooling was temporarily done in Federal Emergency Management Agency (FEMA)-provided trailers. Greensburg Schools superintendent Darin Headrick stated that "Our biggest concern was that if we didn't have a school in the city as quickly as possible, people would not have a reason to move back"; a permanent countywide school began to serve Greensburg in 2010.

=== Greensburg City Hall ===
Greensburg City Hall was rebuilt between 2008 and 2009, to LEED Platinum standards. The rebuilt building was constructed partially using salvaged bricks from a destroyed diesel-generator plant. The building is the only in Greensburg with an open-loop geothermal system, a heat pump system that uses groundwater as the heat transfer fluid for a heat pump. Several other buildings in Greensburg use the closed-loop variant, which transfers heat by circulating fluid through a closed network of pipes. The open-loop system was chosen for the City Hall because it was the most affordable option.

=== Kiowa County Courthouse and Sheriff's Office ===
The Kiowa County Courthouse and Sheriff's House was one of two historic buildings to have survived the tornado, although it still suffered damage. Although the option to tear down the structure did exist, Kiowa County chose to renovate the building to an LEED Gold standard. The renovated, three-story building features high-performance windows, spray foam insulation and a ground-source heat pump.

=== Kiowa County Memorial Hospital ===
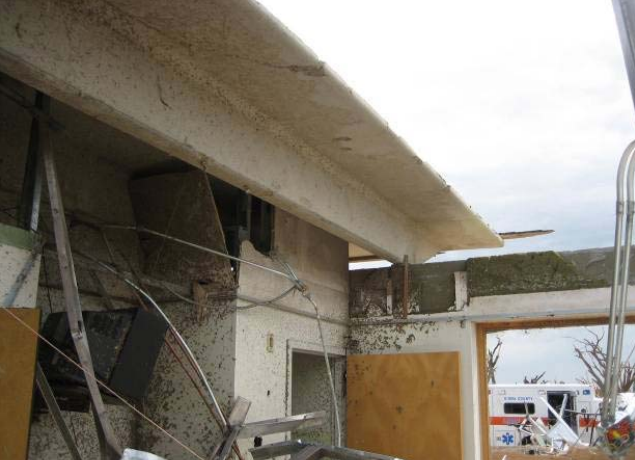
Damage to the Kiowa County Memorial Hospital

The Kiowa County Memorial Hospital had been reinforced with internal vertical steel beams that extended along the floors and ceilings, along with double-thick masonry walls. Despite this, the hospital sustained heavy damage, and a 9,900-pound (4,500 kg) steel beam was lifted from the hospital's frame and lofted onto a vehicle to the hospital's northeast. The tornado also tore off the roof of the hospital, collapsed the walls of the building, and scattered medical equipment around. Staff and patients in the structure took shelter in a basement and as a result were unharmed.

The hospital was unable to be used as a care facility as a result of the tornado. A secondary care location was set up at the Heart to Heart International trailers in Olathe, Kansas. Recovery efforts began immediately following the tornado; workers at the Kiowa County Memorial Hospital decided to begin rebuilding the hospital within 24 hours of its destruction.

=== S.D. Robinett Building ===
The historic S. D. Robinett Building survived the tornado. Built in 1915, it was the only building in the downtown portion of Greensburg, and one of two historic buildings in the city, that was deemed to have not been destroyed in the tornado. The structure underwent a $124,653 rehabilitation, which included the installation of energy-efficient windows to replace windows broken in the tornado, and bamboo flooring; the brick parapet had to be rebuilt and damage to the building's interior needed to be addressed. The building was added to the National Register of Historic Places on May 1, 2010, and the renovated building features an open floor plan, energy-efficient appliances, and spray-foam insulation.

=== Tornado Damage Investigation, Greensburg, Kansas ===
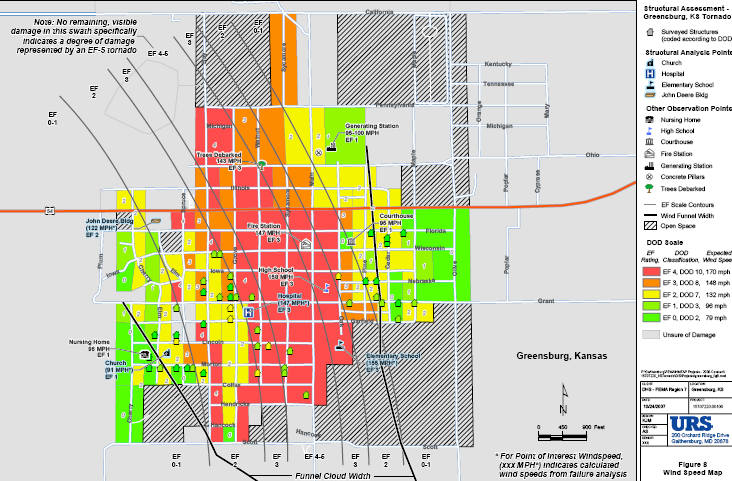
Map of tornado damage in Greensburg produced from the survey

The Federal Emergency Management Agency made two visits to Greensburg in May 2007, following the tornado. During these visits, structural engineers with the URS Corporation conducted a damage survey separate from the one made by engineers with the Haag Company. The survey studied 46 residential structures in Greensburg that were damaged in varying degrees. The damage survey found that zero public tornado shelters were located in Greensburg; people took cover from the tornado in other shelters and cellars. The survey recommended that two new Degree of Damage (DOD) indicators be added to the Enhanced Fujita Scale, in addition to the 23 existing indicators: to evaluate the scale of damage to load-bearing masonry buildings and timber-frame buildings, although neither have been implemented as of September 2025.

=== UMass X-Pol observations ===
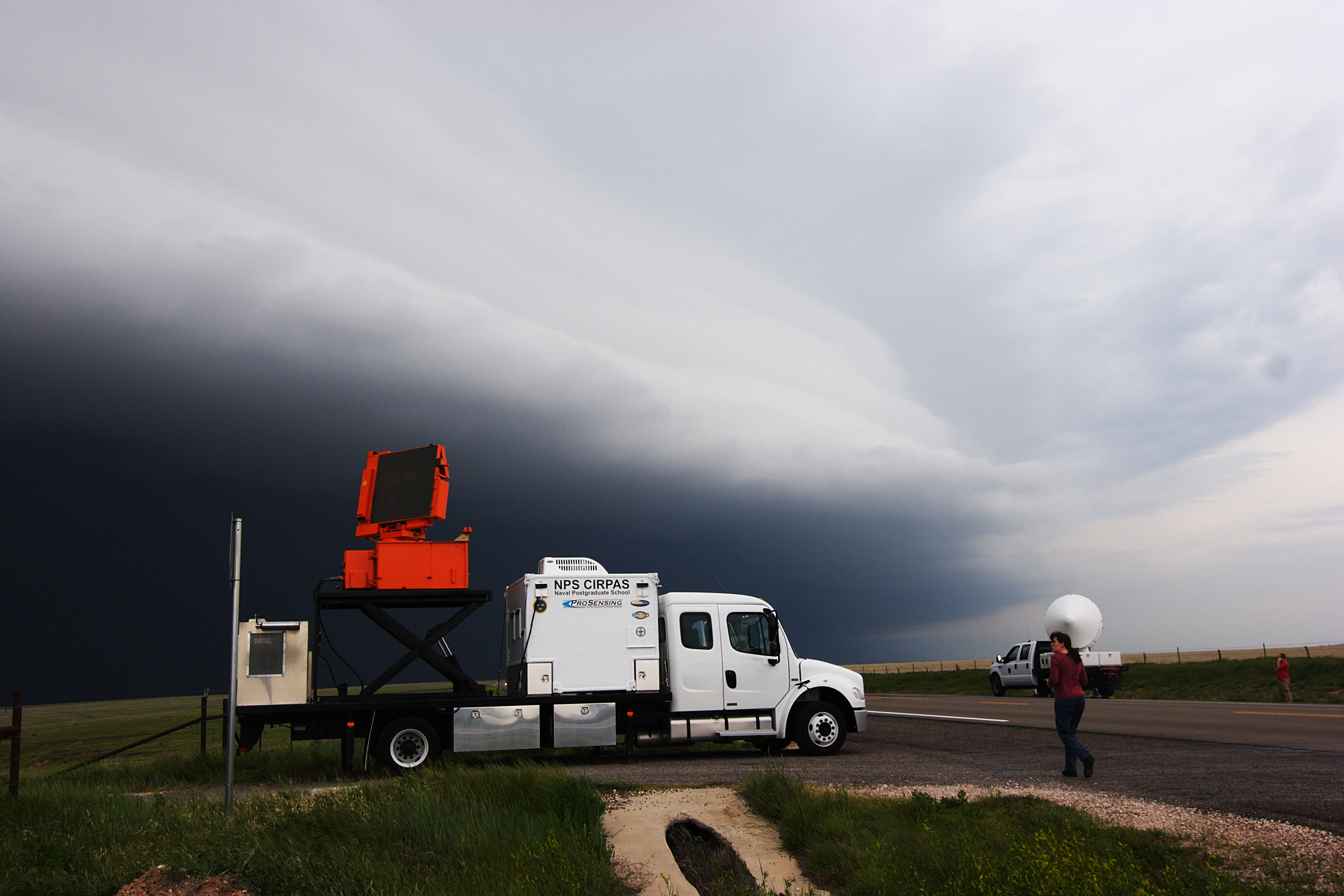
The UMass X-POL instrument (white radar dish, right) seen in 2009 during the VORTEX projects

The UMass X-Pol (X band, mobile, polarimetric Doppler radar), an X band pulse-Doppler radar system with a 1.2-inch (3.0 cm) wavelength installed on a modified Ford F-350 pickup truck, observed the storm. The observation aimed to document the early stages of the Greensburg tornado's life. The study was noted as being one of a few ever conducted to observe both an EF5-rated tornado and two separate storm modes, which refers to the meso-beta-scale organizational characteristics into a severe storm.

=== Rebuilding efforts and reactions ===
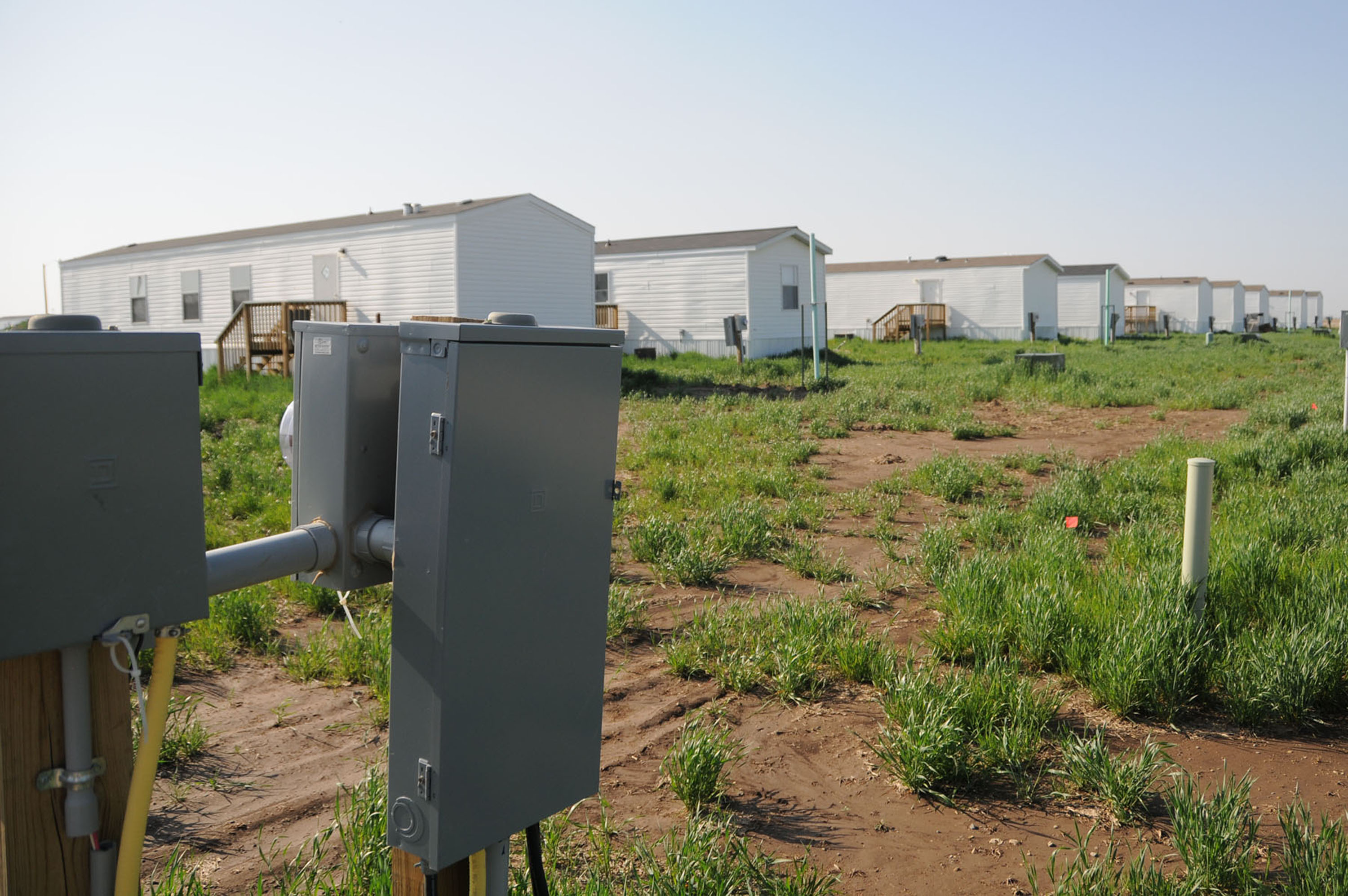
Temporary housing sites in Greensburg that were set up by FEMA in the immediate aftermath of the tornado, dubbed "Femaville" by some residents

Following the tornado, many families signed up to reside in the 200 temporary housing units aligned in rows, or "FEMA shelters" provided by FEMA, where residents lived for up to eighteen months. 500 of the 750 residents who remained in the city lived in these housing sites, dubbed "Femaville" by some residents of Greensburg. The temporary housing units came equipped with items such as blankets and dishes to help living conditions while recovery efforts were underway. Schools and other public buildings in the neighboring towns of Mullinville, Bucklin, and Haviland were also used as temporary shelters for victims of the tornado; the International Red Cross and Red Crescent Movement set up three shelters in Mullinville, one in Haviland and one in Bucklin. As well as providing shelter, FEMA declared that it would pay for 100% of cleanup costs after the event, including at least $7.6 million for housing assistance and almost $10 million for repairing infrastructure in the city. FEMA also hired 21 Greensburg residents to work in recovery positions; 7,604 volunteers registered by AmeriCorps worked to help with recovery efforts. Volunteers logged a total of 57,786 volunteer hours.

Almost 500 soldiers from the National Guard were deployed to Greensburg to aid with recovery efforts, and the crews provided machinery and communications for the area. In April 2009, U.S. Representative Jerry Moran introduced the Greensburg, Kansas Recovery Extension Act to extend recovery funds through June 2010. The legislation died in committee and was never voted on by the House of Representatives.

President George W. Bush visited Greensburg twice following the tornado to survey damage. In a speech he made during his first visit to Greensburg, Bush said: "There is a lot of destruction. Fortunately, a lot of folks had basements here in this part of the world and lived to see another day. Unfortunately, too many died". At-the-time FEMA director R. David Paulison remarked that damage was "some of the worst I've ever seen", and then-mayor of Greensburg Bob Dixson said in 2008 that "on May 4, 2007, we found out what's really important in life and that's not your stuff ... that's your relationship with fellow human beings". The mayor of Greensburg at the time of the tornado, Lonnie McCollum, resigned shortly after the event due to mental exhaustion as well as complaints regarding the town's recovery.

==== Long-term community recovery plan ====
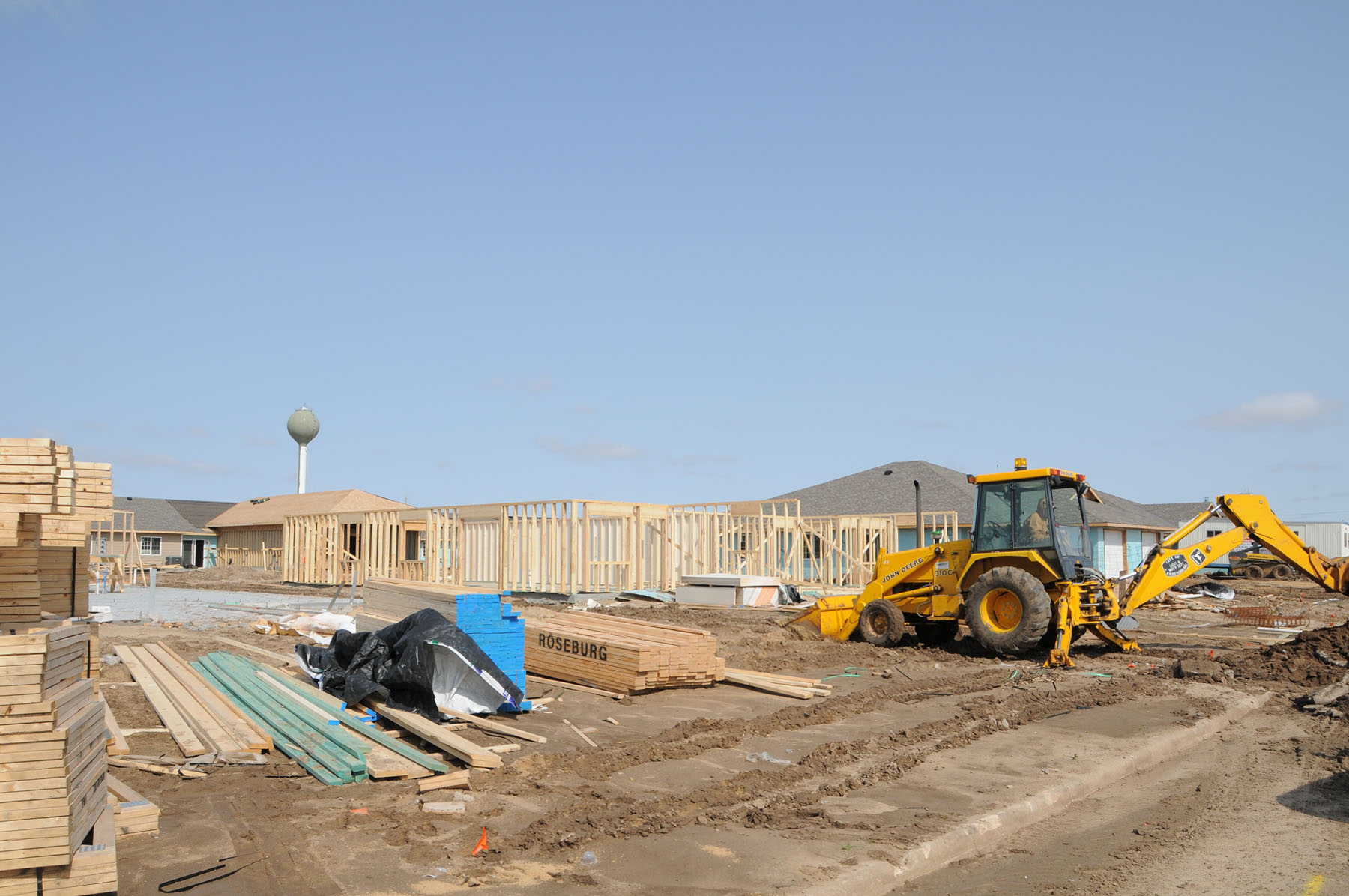
New wood-framed homes being constructed in Greensburg

Shortly after the tornado, Kansas Governor Kathleen Sebelius stated that she wanted Greensburg to be "the greenest city in the state". FEMA activated the "long-term community recovery" (LTCR) program, which was designed to help recovery efforts in Greensburg over time. The United States Department of Energy (USDoE) collaborated with other agencies during the rebuilding process. The Greensburg Wind Farm was developed by the National Renewable Energy Laboratory; it consisted of ten 1.25-megawatt wind turbines.

One of the most critical issues that Greensburg residents faced was finding a way to return to their homes; the LTCR prioritized rebuilding of housing units in Greensburg. The town's economy was significantly affected by the tornado; the LTCR aimed to combat that decline by preparing an Economic Development Strategy (EDS). The goal of the EDS was to not only boost Greensburg's economy, but to also encourage people to move to the city.

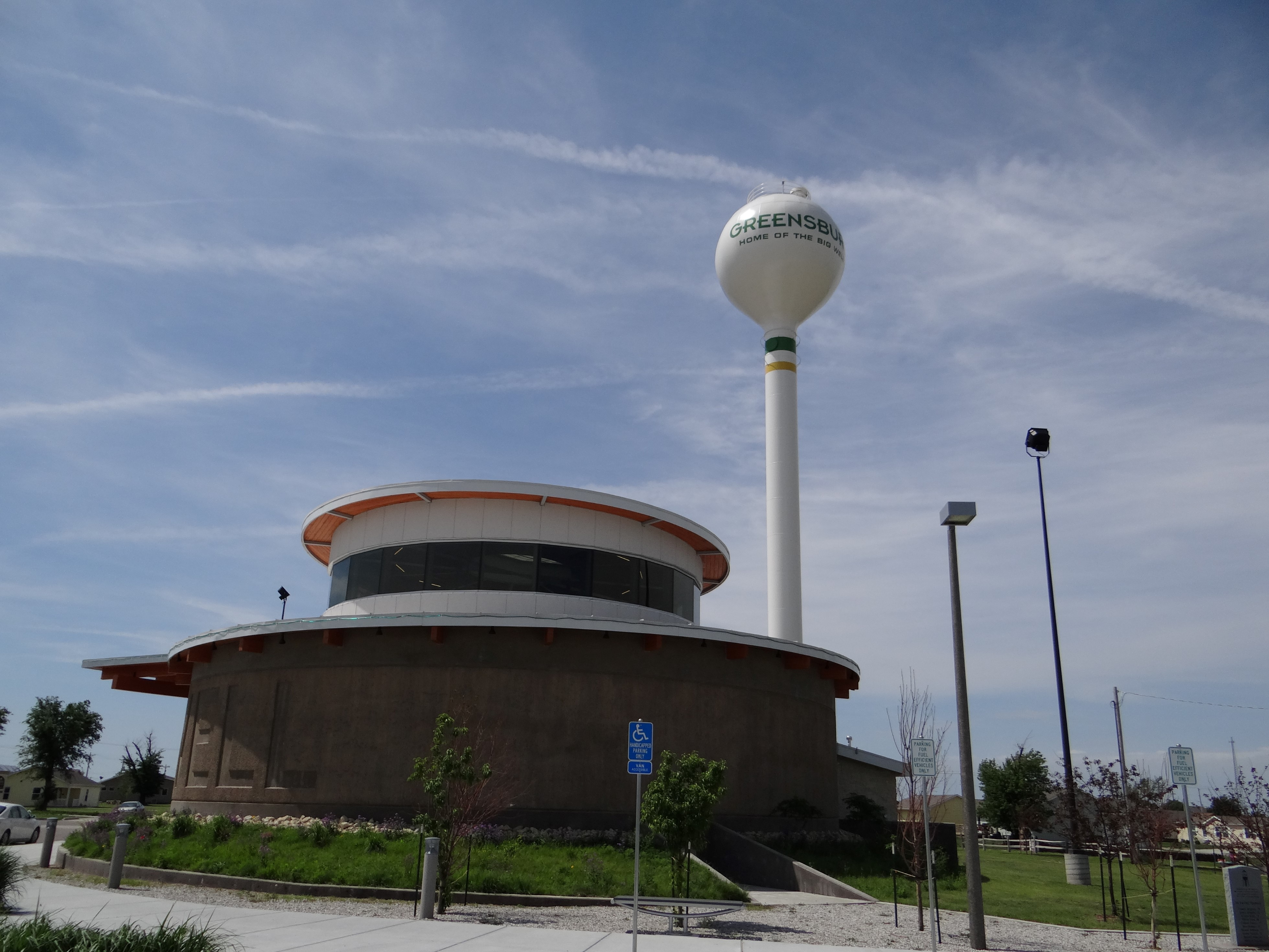
The rebuilt "Big Well" museum in 2013

Along with changes to Greensburg's energy sources, the LTCR also required that all buildings built within the city limits of Greensburg meet Leadership in Energy and Environmental Design (LEED) Platinum certifications. A tornado-resistant "silo home" built within Greensburg attracted attention after the structure was completed in 2009; journalist Jennifer Goodman wrote in a September 2009 publication of Architect Magazine that "the tiny town in Kansas once ravaged by a tornado is drawing eco-tourists from all over the world ...". The publication also noted that 400 tourists from as far away as Europe visited Greensburg from July to September 2007 over a period of two months. As of 2026, Greensburg has the most LEED-certified buildings of any city in the United States per capita, and is also the first city in the country to use fully-LED streetlights.

Although the hand-dug, 109 feet (33 m)-deep Big Well was not destroyed, its respective water tower and an above-ground gift shop that were a centerpiece of the town's history were destroyed in the tornado. The original building was replaced with a circular structure that includes exhibits showcasing the town's history before and after the tornado; the museum reopened on May 26, 2012. Caitlin Matile, who was the tourism director and manager of Greensburg at the time of the museum's reopening, stated: "we do a very good job of displaying things ... what it was, what it is now"; new stairs were added into the well to let visitors reach the bottom.

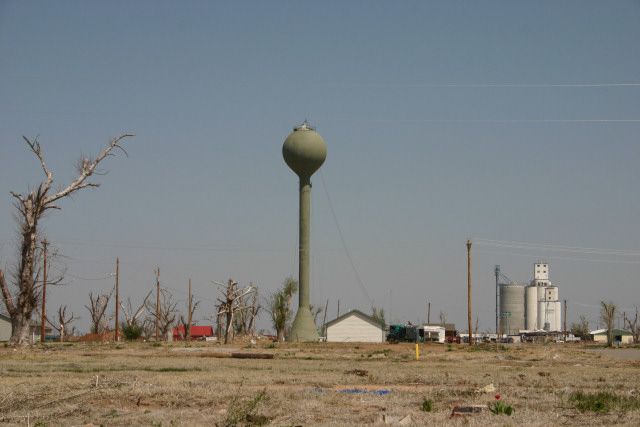
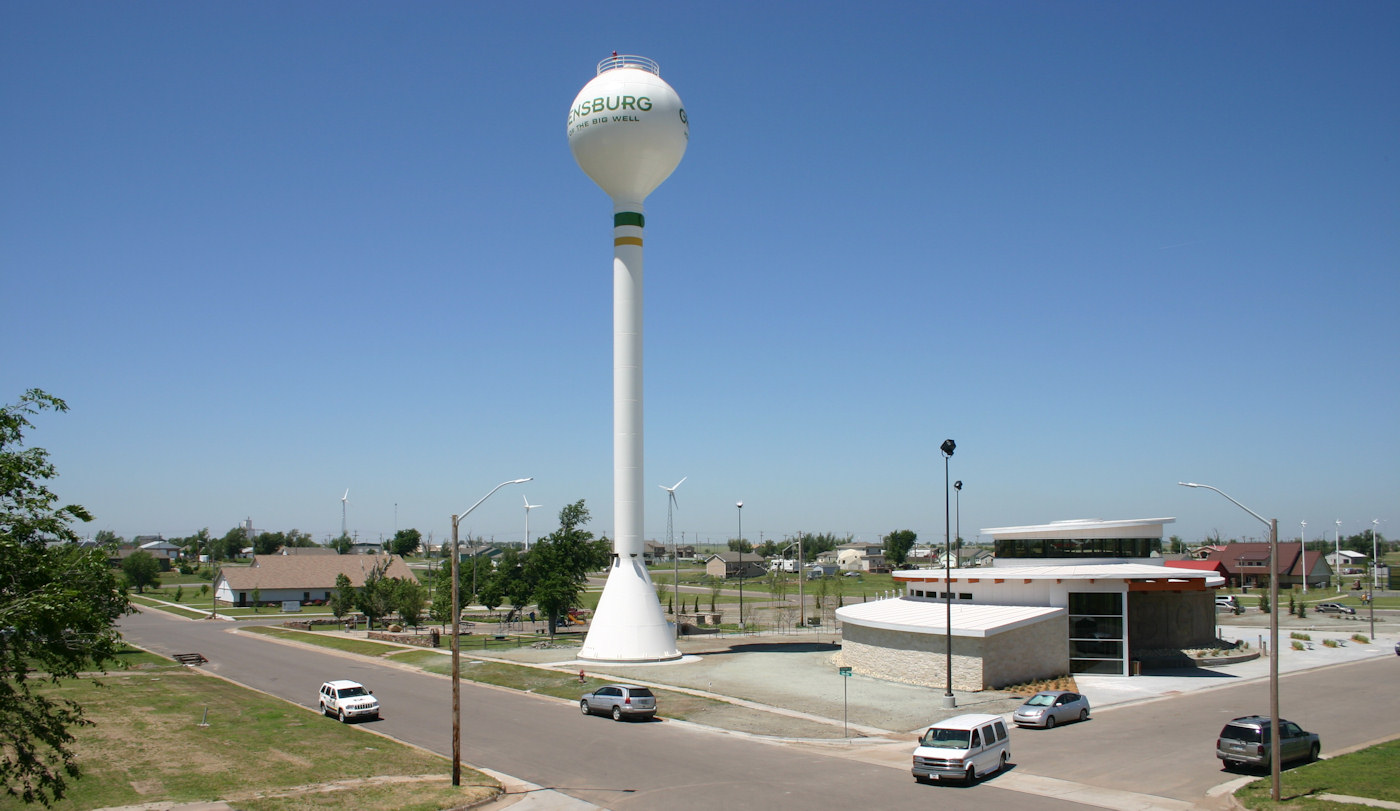
The rebuilt Big Well Water Tower in May 2008 (left) and May 2010 (right). By 2010, the water tower was surrounded by rebuilt buildings.

Professional Engineering Consultants (PEC) was tasked with designing the new tower, which took 45 days; construction was completed by Maguire Iron in 172 days. The water tower was declared complete in May 2008, after having its exterior coated with approximately 165 U.S. gallons (620 L) of Series 700 HydroFlon, a protective thermosetting fluoropolymer designed for use on water towers.

The Kiowa County Memorial Hospital was the only building that was an exception to the LEED Platinum requirement, although the hospital later attained the certification. The new hospital opened in March 2010, at a cost of approximately $25 million (2010 USD) and at a different location in the city. The hospital became the first in the United States to operate using carbon neutral energy. In 2012, the hospital became the first to use entrapped rainwater to run water-based utilities, such as toilets. The rebuilt hospital is equipped with fifteen beds, two trauma rooms, and other rooms included in typical hospitals, while using renewable energy to maintain safety and functionality standards. Two 50-kilowatt wind turbines were installed on the site of the hospital to further reduce fossil fuel usage.

=== County and state-level mitigation ===
==== Kiowa County ====
Greensburg (top, highlighted in red) is located in Kiowa County (bottom, highlighted in orange), which is located in the state of Kansas.

The county employed a part-time emergency manager who was responsible for the entire county's emergency plan in case of a disaster. Before the tornado, the county relied on an informational pamphlet from the 1990s as its emergency action plan; the pamphlet reportedly provided inadequate information in the event of a significant disaster. The pamphlet itself was lost during the tornado and was never located to be fully examined.

Due to Greensburg's size, the city did not have its own emergency services at the time of the tornado; those services were provided by Kiowa County. Additionally, a major emergency response group compromising of ambulance services existed within Kansas EMS Region III, including Kiowa County, prior to the tornado. These services were utilized within 24 hours following the tornado.

==== State of Kansas ====
The Disaster Mitigation Act of 2000 required the state of Kansas to outline policies and requirements for cities regarding county and city-level mitigation. The plan, released in November 2004 and titled the Kansas Hazard Mitigation Plan (KMHP), stated that "mitigation be addressed in the required comprehensive emergency management plan developed by each county"; Kiowa County did not meet this requirement at the time and no punitive action was taken by the state of Kansas to enforce the requirement. The Emergency Planning and Community Right-to-Know Act of 1986 (EPCRA) led the state of Kansas to establish the Kansas Commission on Emergency Planning and Response (KCEPR), which was formed to ensure that the EPCRA was being followed. The KCEPR specifically focused on addressing emergencies involving hazardous industrial materials, but was later adopted by local emergency planning committees to address community-level hazards.

=== Casualties ===
List of fatalities directly attributed to the tornado

- Claude Hopkins, 79
- Larry Hoskins, 51
- David Lyon, 48
- Colleen Panzer, 77
- Ron Rediger, 57
- Evelyn Kelly, 75
- Sarah Tackett, 71
- Beverly Volz, 52
- Max McColm, 77
- Richard Fry, 62
- Harold Schmidt, 77
- Tim Buckman, 46

The number of persons killed during the tornado ranged from 10 to 13. Ten (Note: Due to conflicting numbers, data from a 2013 University of Kansas study is used.) of the fatalities occurred immediately during the tornado, including one person who was driving through Greensburg that night, and two others occurred later in hospitals as a result of tornadic injuries. One of the two in-hospital deaths was a police officer who was taken off life support while being treated for a tornado-induced head injury hours after the event, at a hospital in Wichita. Emergency management officials in Greensburg expected to need "hundreds of body bags". Meteorologist Mike Smith noted that the tornado's death toll "should've been higher", being mitigated by effective warning communication and accurate forecasting.

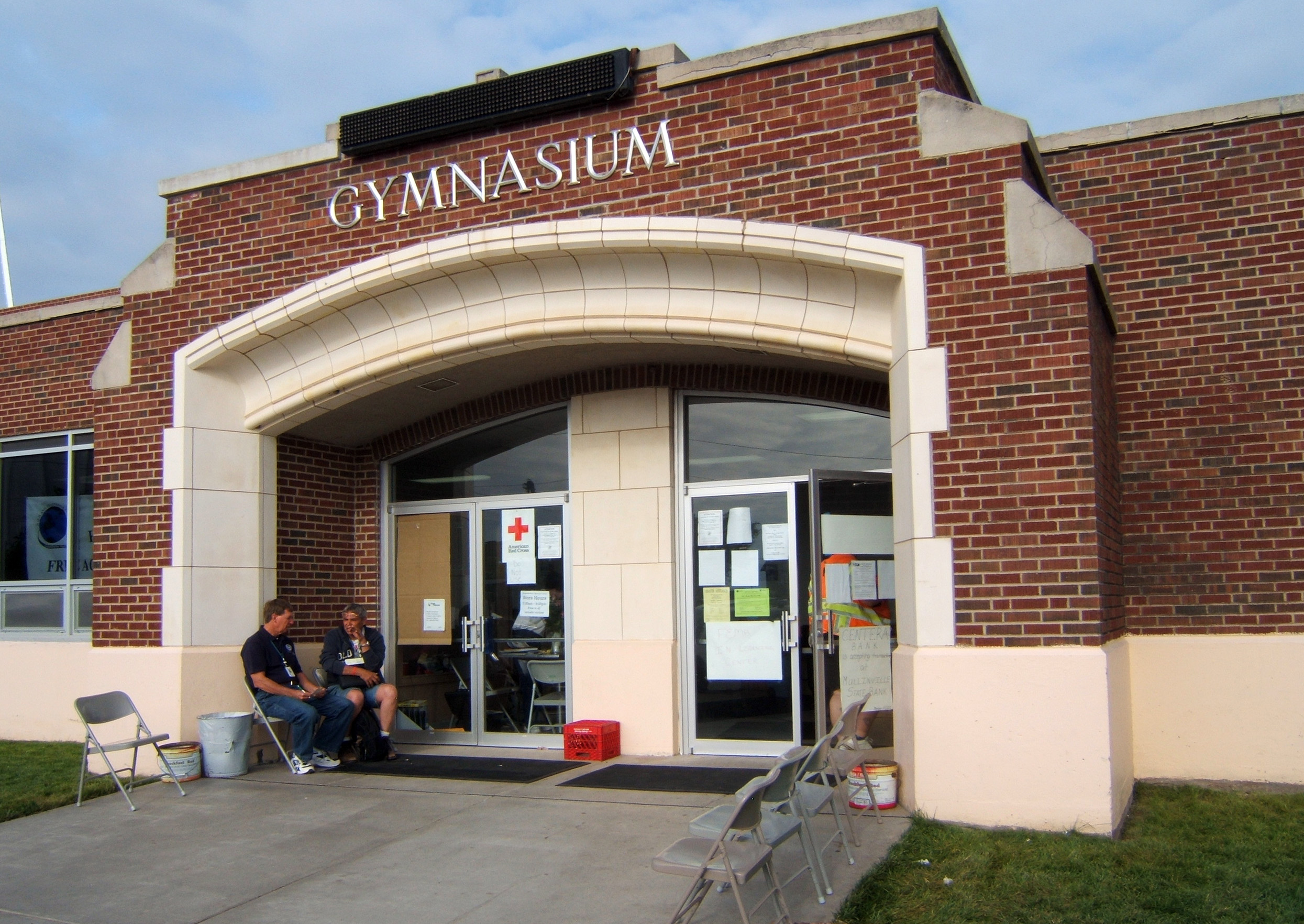
A shelter in Mullinville established by residents following the tornado

Approximately 90 people were taken to hospitals within the first day following the tornado. Greensburg's main hospital, the Kiowa County Memorial Hospital, was destroyed by the tornado; those who were injured had to be treated in several nearby cities with functional hospitals, including Dodge City, Pratt, Kinsley, and Wichita. The Pratt Regional Medical Center in Pratt received the most tornado patients of any hospital in the area, 59 people being transferred to the facility for treatment. Six patients who were already being treated for unrelated injuries at the Kiowa County Memorial Hospital before the tornado were transferred to the Comanche County Hospital, although none sustained tornadic injuries.

A study carried out by the University of Kansas Health System in April 2013 concluded that the critical mortality rate, a measure of the number of deaths in a certain population, from the tornado was 18% and that age was related to the degree of injuries sustained from the tornado.

== Legacy ==
The tornado and its aftermath have been featured in two television series: Greensburg, created by actor Leonardo DiCaprio and which documents the aftermath of the tornado; and the Science Channel miniseries Build It Bigger: Rebuilding Greensburg. Depictions of the event are also present in several pieces of literature, including The Greening of Oz by author Robert Fraga. In the book, Fraga writes: "The reconstruction is nearly complete, and it's a model for towns everywhere in this country. A new town has grown up out of the prairie with a spectacular collection of public buildings".

=== Other tornadoes ===
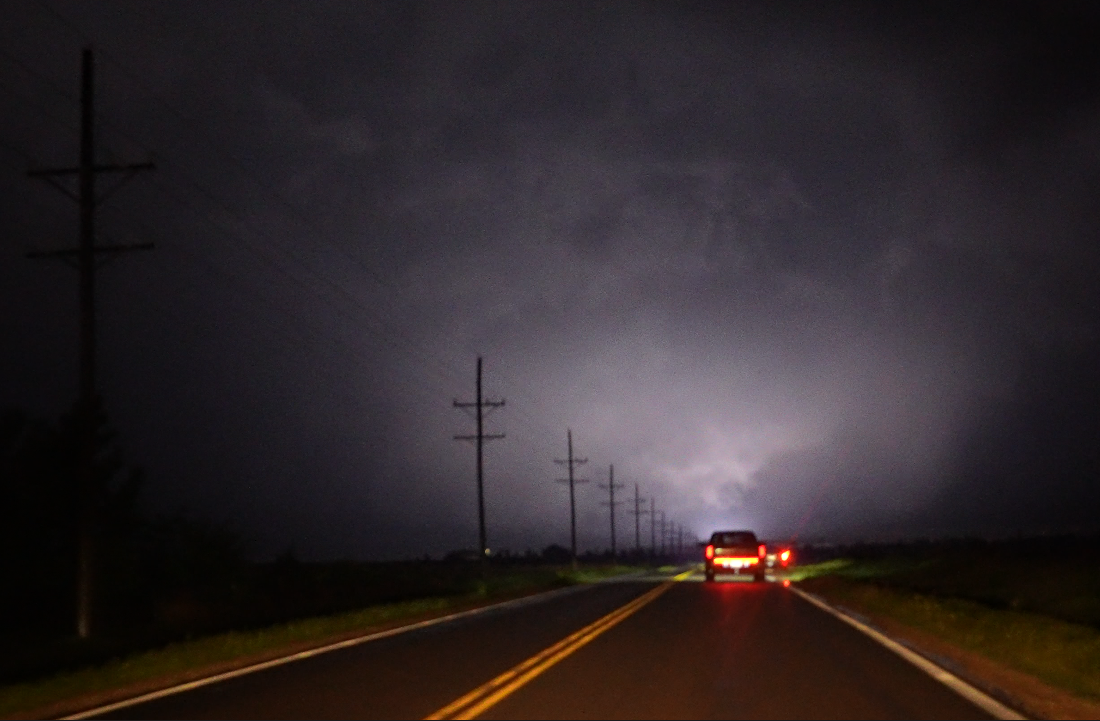
An EF3 tornado crossing US 183 south of Greensburg on May 18, 2025

Greensburg has seen other tornadoes around its borders before and after the 2007 tornado, including multiple significant (EF2+) tornadoes over the years. On May 22, 1923, an F3-rated tornado grazed the edge of the city, injuring eight people and affecting 40 homes. On June 16, 1928, an F2 tornado tracked 40 miles (64 km) (Note: Possibly a tornado family.) through areas west and south of Greensburg, injuring two people. On May 5, 2007, the day following the EF5 tornado, a much weaker tornado tracked a short distance west of the city; surveyors had been assessing damage from the night before approximately 30 minutes before the tornado touched down.

In April 2012, a large EF3 tornado, described by the National Weather Service as "eerily similar to the Greensburg tornado", developed west of Greensburg and moved towards Macksville, crossing over areas that had been hit during the 2007 tornado. On May 18, 2025, amid a destructive tornado outbreak across the region, a strong EF3 tornado moved through areas south and east of Greensburg, prompting a tornado emergency for the city, the second time in Greensburg's history that one had been issued. The tornado damaged the community of Brenham, although no fatalities or injuries were recorded. Television station KAKE described the tornado as "stirring up painful memories" of the 2007 event.

== See also ==
- List of F5, EF5, and IF5 tornadoes
  - 2025 Enderlin tornado – another nighttime EF5 tornado in North Dakota with a pronounced leftward turn at the end of its lifespan
- List of notable media in the field of meteorology
- List of tornadoes in the tornado outbreak of May 4–6, 2007
