= Tornado outbreak of May 4–6, 2007 =

2007 tornado outbreak in the United States

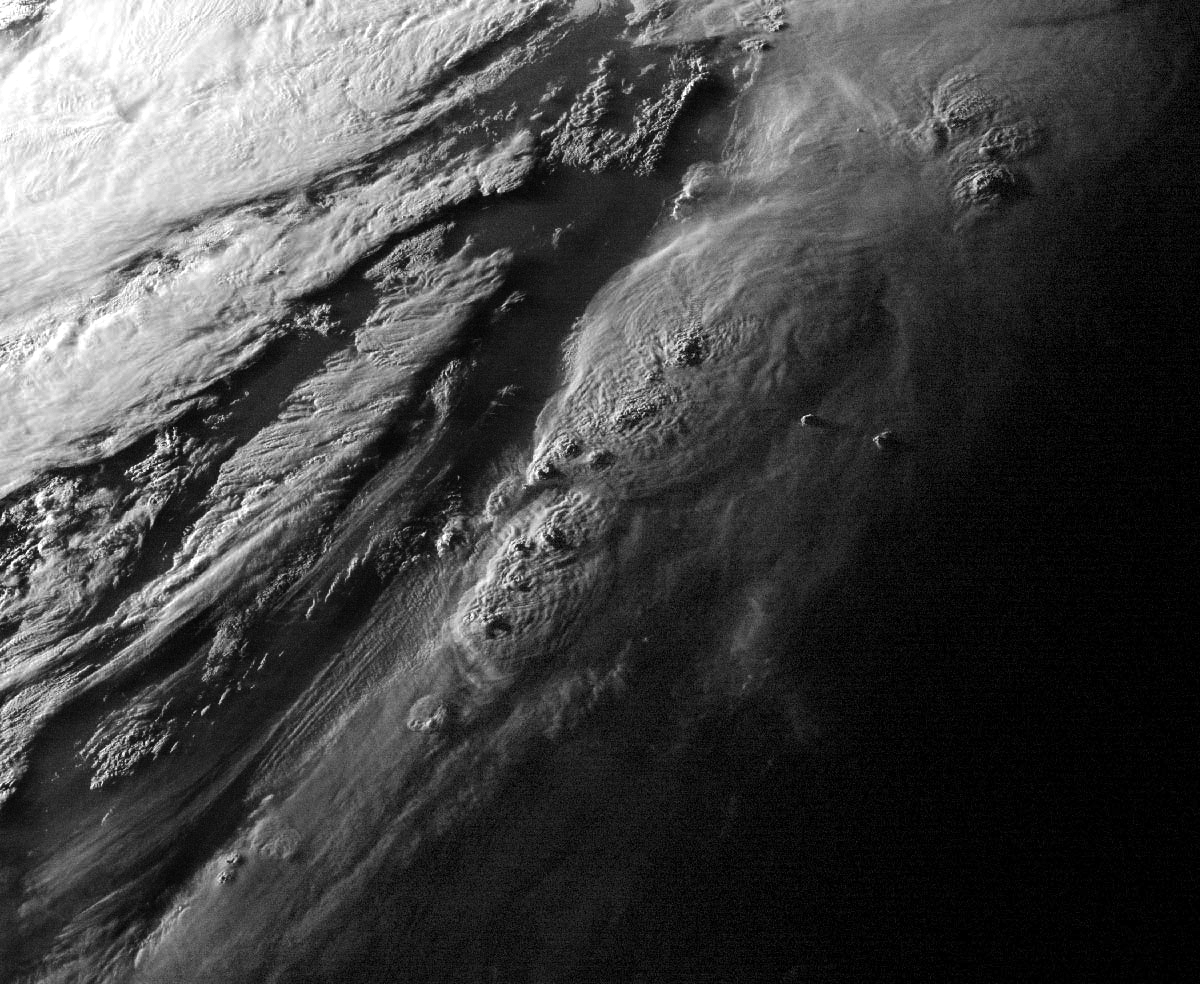
- Satellite perspective of the tornadic supercells over the Great Plains on the evening of May 5

Meteorological history
- Duration: May 4–6, 2007

Tornado outbreak
- Tornadoes: 132
- Max. rating: EF5 tornado
- Duration: 2 days, 8 hours, 9 minutes
- Highest winds: Tornadic – 205 mph (330 km/h) (Greensburg, Kansas EF5 on May 4)
- Highest gusts: Non-tornadic – 100 mph (160 km/h) in Claflin, Kansas on May 4
- Largest hail: 4.25 inches (10.8 cm) in Bloomfield, Nebraska on May 5

Extratropical cyclone
- Lowest pressure: 992 hPa (mbar); 29.29 inHg
- Max. rainfall: 8.73 inches (222 mm) in Columbia, South Dakota
- Max. snowfall: 15 inches (38 cm) near Conifer, Colorado

Overall effects
- Fatalities: 14 fatalities, 89 injuries
- Damage: $268 million
- Areas affected: Great Plains, Central United States
- Part of the tornado outbreaks of 2007

From May 4–6, 2007, a major and damaging tornado outbreak significantly affected portions of the Central United States, with several strong to violent long-track tornadoes occurring across much of the impacted regions. The Storm Prediction Center (SPC) issued a moderate risk of severe thunderstorms for May 4 over portions of Central Nebraska, Western Kansas, Western Oklahoma, Eastern Colorado and portions of the Texas Panhandle. The most destructive tornado in the outbreak occurred on the evening of May 4 in western Kansas, where about 95% of the city of Greensburg in Kiowa County was damaged or destroyed by an EF5 tornado, the first rated as such on the Enhanced Fujita Scale since its introduction months earlier, and the first to reach such a high rating since the 1999 Bridge Creek–Moore tornado (rated F5 on the legacy Fujita scale). The supercell killed 13 people, including 11 in Greensburg and two from separate tornadoes. At least 63 people were injured in Greensburg alone. It was the strongest tornado of an outbreak which included several other tornadoes reported across Oklahoma, Colorado, Kansas and South Dakota that occurred on the same night.

On the morning of May 5, the SPC issued a high risk across central Kansas and Nebraska. The Storm Prediction Center also issued a moderate risk for southern South Dakota and northwest Oklahoma and a slight risk for most of Oklahoma, northern South Dakota, southern North Dakota, eastern Nebraska, western Iowa and northeastern Colorado. Severe weather reports were already coming in by late morning, and the first tornado reports came in during the early afternoon hours. The most intense activity took place during the late afternoon and evening hours as supercells developed along a long line from South Dakota to North Texas. Over 80 tornadoes were confirmed that day, along with hail as large as softballs and straight–line winds as strong as 90 mph (145 km/h). The activity weakened in the late evening, but not before the last tornadoes were reported in Iowa in the overnight hours. The SPC also issued a moderate risk for severe storms over parts of central Kansas and northern Oklahoma on May 6. The activity was far less than on the two previous days, however there were still several additional tornadoes across the Plains, all of which were weak. 14 fatalities and 89 injuries occurred as a result of the tornadoes, nearly all of which came from the Greensburg tornado on May 4.

A total of 132 tornadoes touched down during the two-day outbreak, making it one of the largest to occur in the United States. In 2023, tornado expert Thomas P. Grazulis published the outbreak intensity score (OIS) as a way to rank outbreaks. The outbreak received 70 OIS points, ranking it as a major tornado outbreak.

== Meteorological synopsis ==
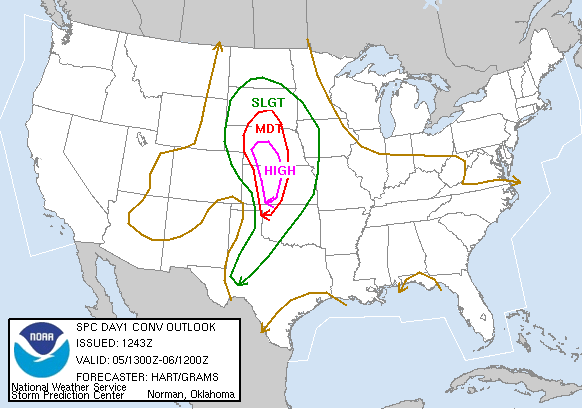
The 1300 UTC day one convective outlook, showing a high risk area in south-central Nebraska and western Kansas, surrounded by a large area of moderate and slight risk across the Great Plains.

It is the combination of warm humid air from the Gulf and dry air from the deserts of the Southwest that produce deadly storms. These conditions cause instability that allows severe storms to develop. Although tornadoes occur on every continent except Antarctica, they are most common in North America, especially the United States.

=== May 4, 2007 ===
This severe weather outbreak can be traced back to a powerful, slow-moving low pressure area with a warm front to the north over Nebraska and Missouri. On May 4, the low stalled over the High Plains and additional moisture coming from the Gulf of Mexico moved in behind the warm front and increased amounts of instability across much of the region, with CAPE values as high as 5,500 J/kg. In addition, the dry line, which marks a divided line between the dry and humid air mass, was positioned over the southern High Plains. This allowed for the initiation of scattered supercells on May 4. High wind shear also allowed for intense rotation in the atmosphere. All of the ingredients were present in the atmosphere for the developing of supercell thunderstorms producing damaging wind, large hail and tornadoes.

The Storm Prediction Center issued a moderate risk for severe weather across western Kansas and small portions of Oklahoma, Colorado and Nebraska for May 4, while temperatures were in the mid to high 80s°F (near 30 °C). The atmosphere remained capped for much of the day, but storms began to develop in the late afternoon hours in western Oklahoma and the eastern Texas Panhandle. The most intense supercells developed in the early evening hours across northwestern Oklahoma and southwestern Kansas. They eventually produced 25 tornadoes, including the devastating Greensburg tornado and three other extremely large tornadoes which followed the Greensburg tornado late that evening. The supercells remained intact well into the overnight hours as the extremely unstable air mass precluded rapid dissipation expected with the loss of daytime heating which would normally be expected in the Plains. The last tornado of the night did not lift until shortly after 2:00 a.m. early on May 5.

=== May 5–6 ===
On May 5, the SPC issued a high risk of severe weather for Central Kansas and central Nebraska, while moderate and slight risks for severe weather extended for areas far beyond. The low pressure system in place moved northward, but the extending front had barely moved. The storms were quick to develop. Severe weather reports were already coming in by late morning, and the first tornado reports came in during the early afternoon hours. The most intense activity took place during the late afternoon and evening hours as supercells developed along a long line from South Dakota to North Texas. Over 80 tornadoes were confirmed that day, along with hail as large as softballs and straight–line winds as strong as 90 mph (140 km/h). The activity weakened in the late evening, but not before the last tornadoes were reported in Iowa in the overnight hours.

The low gradually weakened and became less conducive for severe weather development on May 6. Nonetheless, the SPC issued a moderate risk for severe storms over parts of central Kansas and northern Oklahoma as the trough remained in place. The activity was far less than on the two previous days, however there were still several additional tornadoes across the Plains (all of them weak, mostly EF0). The system finally left the area on May 7 and did not produce any more significant severe weather.

== Confirmed tornadoes ==
Confirmed tornadoes by Enhanced Fujita rating
FU	EF0	EF1	EF2	EF3	EF4	EF5	Total
0	70	41	15	5	0	1	132

Over the course of the outbreak, 132 tornadoes touched down. By far the most notable events took place on May 4, when a supercell in Kansas produced multiple intense to violent tornadoes, including the Greensburg tornado. Altogether, the Greensburg supercell produced 22 tornadoes over a period of 8 hours, including eight weaker and satellite tornadoes that occurred along with the four large wedge tornadoes. The new Enhanced Fujita scale was implemented on February 1, 2007, and the Greensburg tornado was the first tornado to be rated EF5 on it. Including tornadoes from the older Fujita scale, the most recent F5 to hit the United States had been on May 3, 1999, during the 1999 Oklahoma tornado outbreak, when the Bridge Creek–Moore tornado affected parts of Central Oklahoma.

This tornado event surpassed the number of fatalities registered on May 4, 2003, during the May 2003 tornado outbreak sequence when eight people were killed by three separate tornadoes that affected areas around Kansas City and points south and west of the city; the last major deadly outbreak registered in Kansas prior to the Greensburg event. It was also the deadliest day and single tornado to hit the state of Kansas since April 26, 1991, when an F5 tornado (which was also the last F5 in that state before this event) hit Wichita and Andover in Sedgwick and Butler counties, killing 17 people.

=== Greensburg, Kansas tornado family ===
Greensburg, Kansas tornado family
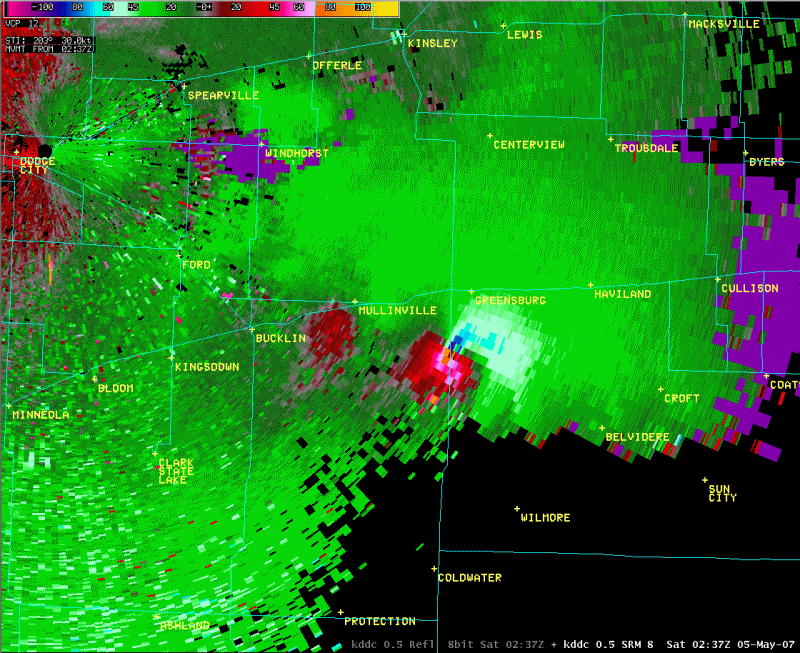
- Doppler wind velocities on NWS weather radar shortly before the tornado hit Greensburg. A second developing circulation (mesocyclone), which later developed into another very large tornado, is also evident.

Meteorological history
- Formed: May 4, 2007, 8:32 p.m. CDT (UTC–05:00)
- Dissipated: May 5, 2007, 1:53 a.m. CDT (UTC–05:00)
- Duration: 5 hours, 21 minutes

Tornado family
- Tornadoes: 22
- Max. rating: EF5 tornado
- Highest winds: 205 mph (330 km/h) (Greensburg, Kansas tornado)

Overall effects
- Fatalities: 13
- Injuries: 65
- Damage: $268 million (2007 USD)
- Areas affected: Southern Kansas, especially Greensburg

Confirmed tornadoes by Enhanced Fujita rating
FU	EF0	EF1	EF2	EF3	EF4	EF5	Total
0	11	7	0	3	0	1	22

The storm that produced the Greensburg tornado began forming after 5:00 pm CDT (2200 UTC) in the northeastern corner of the Texas Panhandle, and went through phases in the early evening across the Oklahoma panhandle with a few isolated tornadoes. It slowly organized itself as it moved northeast through portions of Oklahoma, and then into Kansas. The first tornado warning associated with this cell was issued at 8:35 pm CDT (0135 UTC) for Clark County, Kansas.

==== Greensburg, Kansas ====
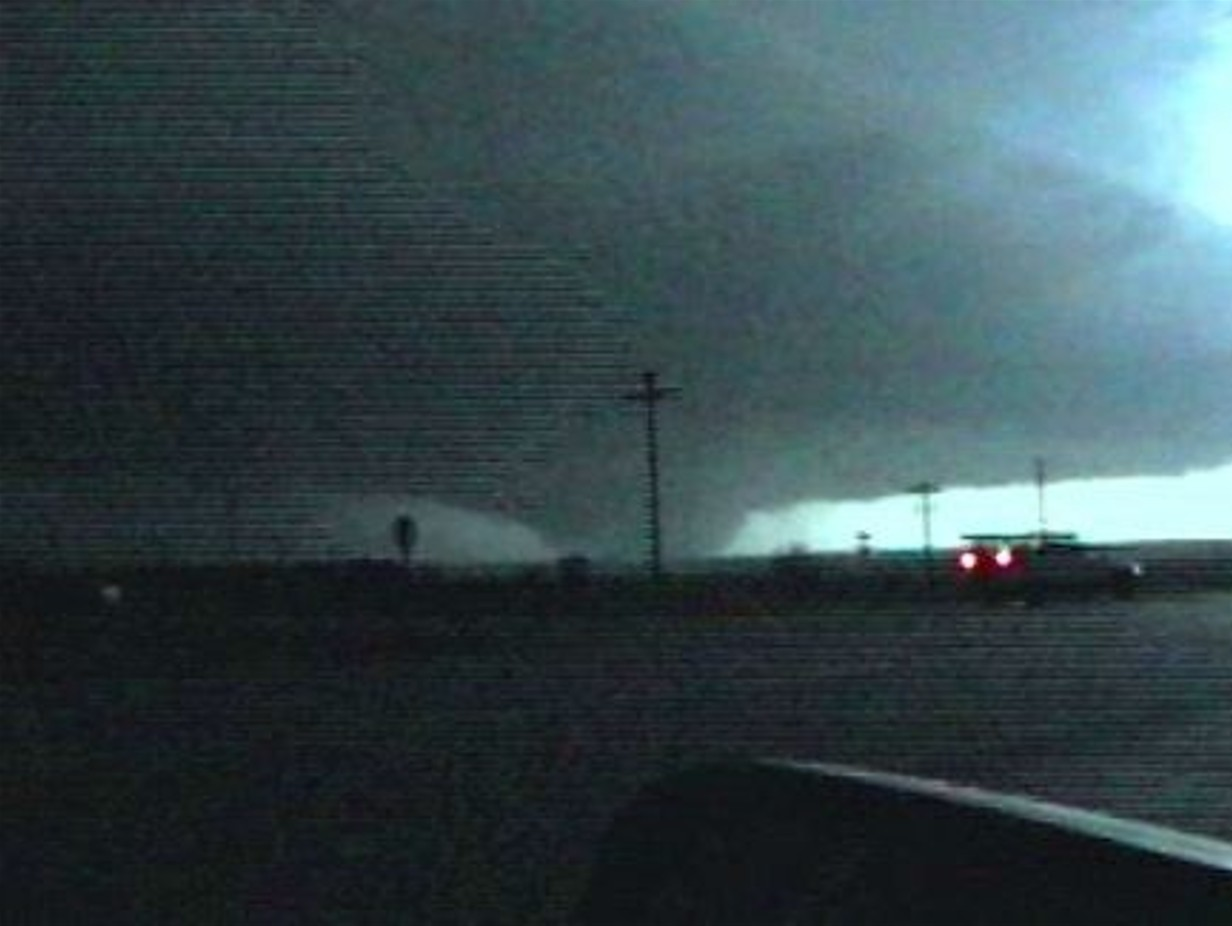
A point of view of the Greensburg tornado from Highway 148.

This extremely large and violent tornado first touched down at about 9:00 pm CDT (0200 UTC). Several storm chasers captured the formation of a tornado south of Greensburg around 9:20 pm CDT (0220 UTC), which apparently strengthened as it neared Greensburg and began moving due-north towards the town, and at 9:38 pm CDT (0238 UTC), storm chasers reported that it had grown to over 1/2 mile in diameter. Eyewitnesses and storm chasers reported that multiple vortices were circulating around the perimeter of the large, wedge-shaped tornado during its early stages. A short time later, at least two distinct satellite tornadoes, including a narrow rope tornado, were reported by local media and observed by multiple weather spotters and storm chasers.

As the main tornado continued through rural areas, many trees were snapped and debarked, severe ground scouring occurred, and oil tanks were destroyed, with oil strewn across pastures and roads. It continued to grow in size as the very large wedge tornado approached the city of Greensburg from the south. As the tornado crossed Highway 183 south of town, it reached its maximum width of 1.7 miles wide. Several farmsteads along the highway were damaged or destroyed, livestock was killed, and trees were denuded and debarked in this area as well. At 9:41 pm CDT (0241 UTC) the National Weather Service office in Dodge City issued a tornado emergency for Greensburg. A tornado emergency is an unofficial product used only for extremely life–threatening situations when a large and likely violent tornado is on the ground and approaching a populated area.

The massive tornado continued due-north, following Main Street into the south side of Greensburg. Multiple homes, including an entire row of seven adjacent residences, were swept completely away and scattered across a field in this area at the south edge of town. Three of the houses were well-bolted to their foundations, and ground scouring occurred nearby. Damage in this area was rated EF5 as a result.

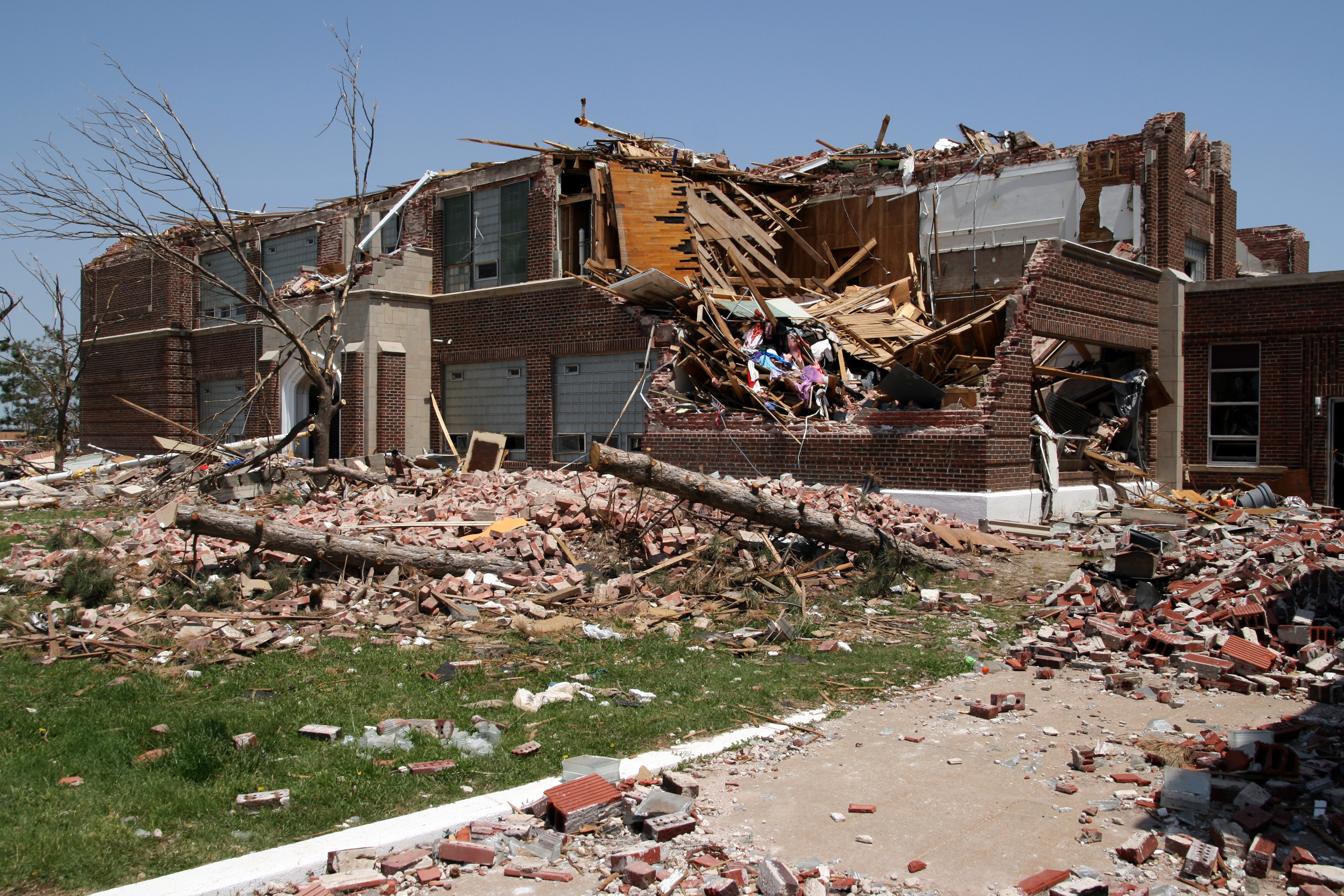
The destroyed Greensburg High School after the tornado.

Two schools, a Tractor Supply Company store, the Greensburg City Hall and other businesses fell victim to the violent winds and were destroyed or flattened. A motel on the west side of town was severely damaged, trees throughout the town were completely denuded and stripped clean of all bark, and vehicles were thrown hundreds of yards and mangled beyond recognition. Several fire hydrants were ripped from the ground in town as well. Greensburg High School was mostly destroyed by the tornado, sustaining high-end EF4 damage. One wing of the school was completely flattened, despite being well-built and constructed with triple-thick masonry walls.

The Kiowa County Memorial Hospital was severely damaged at EF3 intensity, and a 4.9-ton reinforced concrete beam was lifted from the structure and thrown onto a nearby vehicle. Past downtown, neighborhoods in northern Greensburg were completely flattened, and many homes were swept cleanly away. A large brick Mennonite Church in this area was completely leveled with the foundation partially swept clean of debris, vehicles were thrown and mangled, trees sustained complete debarking, and severe ground scouring occurred before the tornado left the city limits. The tornado continued north of Greensburg, executing a loop in a farm field before dissipating. The total path length was 22 miles (35 km), and the width of the funnel reached 1.7 miles (2.7 km). Overall, 95% of Greensburg was destroyed. A total of 961 homes and businesses were destroyed, 216 received major damage and 307 received minor damage.

==== Trousdale–Belpre, Kansas ====
After the main Greensburg tornado dissipated, this intense and enormous wedge tornado developed north of town. The tornado rapidly grew to 2.2 miles (3.5 km) in diameter as it moved northeast. Near the beginning of the path, two farms were destroyed at high-end EF3 strength, a combine was tossed 1/4 of a mile and smashed to pieces, farm machinery and irrigation pivots were destroyed, along with trees and power lines. Many trees were denuded and debarked in rural areas. The tornado crossed into Edwards County, where additional farms were destroyed, one person was injured, and livestock was killed before the tornado dissipated south of Belpre.

==== Wellsford–Hopewell–Macksville, Kansas ====
This intense EF3 tornado formed as the above tornado was dissipating. Trees and irrigation pivots were damaged in Kiowa and Edwards Counties. Within Pratt County, the tornado grew dramatically and intensified, completely levelling one home. A man was killed in his home when the walls collapsed on him in the basement. In Stafford County, farms sustained extensive damage and a grain cart was thrown 0.75 miles (1.21 km), being destroyed in the process. One home was swept from its foundation. Several heads of cattle and local wildlife were killed along the tornado's path. Two people were injured. One home in this area was swept completely away, and a vehicle was thrown 3/4 of a mile and mangled beyond recognition. The tornado then weakened and dissipated south of Macksville.

==== Macksville–Stafford, Kansas ====
Southeast of Macksville, this large EF3 wedge tornado developed and quickly grew to just under a mile wide as it moved northeast. A police cruiser was thrown 1/4 of a mile from Highway 50 by the tornado and destroyed, killing the officer inside who was watching the previous tornado as it dissipated. Over a dozen farms, trees, pieces of farm machinery, vehicles, irrigation pivots, and power poles were damaged or destroyed by this fourth and final large wedge tornado before it dissipated.

== Non-tornadic events ==
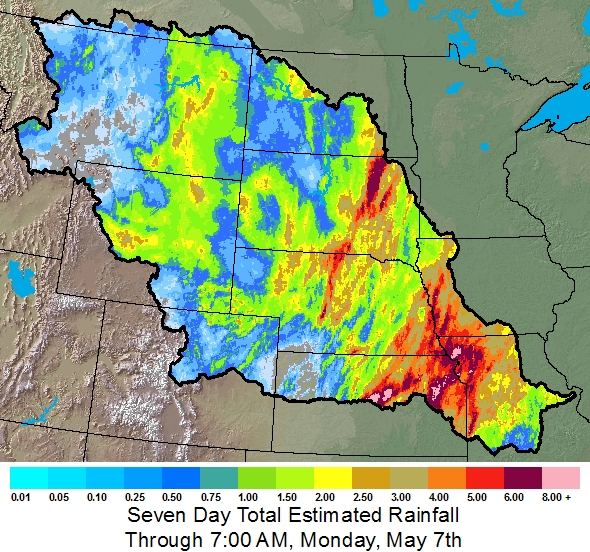
Rain amounts during the first week of May in the Missouri River Basin

Across portions of eastern Nebraska and western Iowa, rainfall amounts exceeded locally 6 inches (152 mm). In northeastern and central Kansas, rainfall amounts approached 5 – 6 inches locally (125 – 150 mm). In North Dakota, southern Manitoba and southern Saskatchewan, heavy rainfalls of 1–3 inches (25–76 millimetres) fell from this system from May 4 to May 7. Similar amounts were reported in Alberta on May 3 and May 4.

Some of the worst flooding affected Topeka, Kansas, where several rescues had to be made, and the Kansas City Metro Area, where several roads were closed. In neighboring Missouri, levees broke along the Missouri River which caused extensive flooding to hundreds of homes and the northwest and central part of the state. The National Guard were assisting on filling sandbags to protect homes, schools and plants across the state which experienced some of the worst flooding since the Great Flood of 1993 which affected most of the Mississippi River Valley. Torrential rains on May 10 had also caused flooding in parts of southern Missouri as well as in eastern Kansas. The heavy rains also affected activities surrounding the Riverfest (Wichita River Festival) which postponed some events until May 14. The Arkansas River reached record levels near Haven when it crested at 13.08 feet on May 8. Some flooding into low-lying areas was also observed in the Wichita Metropolitan Area. Rainfall amounts in southern and southeastern Kansas also exceeded 6 inches (152 mm) over a two-day period on May 6 and May 7. There were several reports of farmers who lost several cattle who have been toss by the high water levels.

In Aberdeen, South Dakota, 7.75 inches (197 mm) of rain fell the evening of May 5 into the early morning hours of May 6, causing significant flooding in some areas around the city. It was also the city's new 24‑hour record rainfall, breaking the old mark of 5.20 inches (132 mm) set in June 1978. The highest unofficial rainfall total was reported in Epiphany, South Dakota where as much as 10 inches (254 mm) fell during the weekend. The highest official report of rain, 8.73 inches (222 mm) at Columbia, South Dakota, set a new official 24-hour May rainfall record for the entire state of South Dakota.

In southern Oklahoma City and surrounding communities, strong straight-line winds caused damage to several buildings and downed trees and power lines in the early morning hours of May 7, with cleanup efforts being complicated due to flooding rains accompanying the storm. About 11,000 homes were without power during the event. There were also reports of floods across many other areas in Oklahoma. Oklahoma Governor Brad Henry had declared a state of emergency for all 77 counties across the state due to all the severe weather including the tornadoes, the flash floods and hail.

Snow was also reported across higher elevations in Colorado, Wyoming, Nebraska and Utah with local amounts of up to one foot (30 cm) across central Colorado.

== Aftermath ==
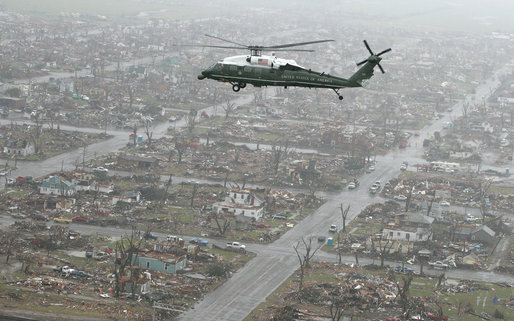
Marine One, carrying George W. Bush, flies over the devastated community of Greensburg, Kansas Wednesday, May 9, 2007.

Hours after the tornado hit, Greensburg was judged unsafe and was fully evacuated. Some of the injured were transferred to hospitals in Dodge City and Wichita. The Kansas National Guard was called in to assist in the security measures. Over 100 Red Cross officials were called in while some worked with the Federal Emergency Management Agency for the recovery efforts. Shelters were established at the Haviland High School and Barclay College in nearby Haviland, Kansas and the Oddfellow Lodge in Macksville, Kansas. After the tornado, looting was reported in the community and at least seven suspects, including four soldiers that were not part of the relief effort and went to Greensburg on their own, were arrested and faced charges of burglary and theft. A dusk-to-dawn curfew was put in place in the community after the tornado hit.

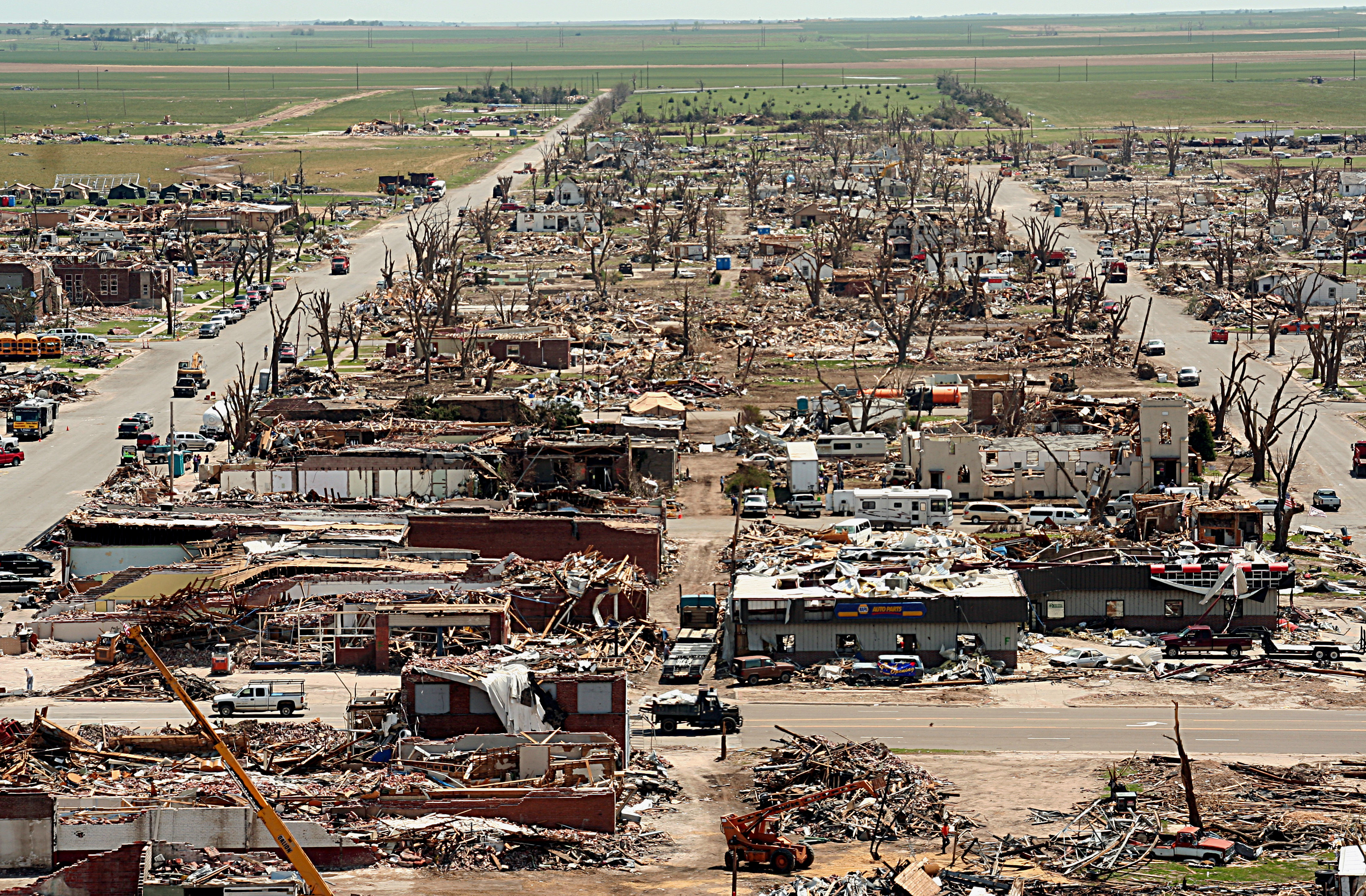
The center of Greensburg, Kansas, 12 days after being hit by the 2007 tornado.

Officials set up a shelter for lost and injured animals as they reported to have found 163 animals alive in Greensburg after the tornado. Kansas Governor Kathleen Sebelius and President George W. Bush both declared Kiowa County a disaster area.

Total damage from the outbreak was estimated at $268 million, and insured damage from the Greensburg tornado alone was estimated at $153 million. Following the devastating EF5 tornado, Greensburg's population declined and had continued to decline through 2024.

== See also ==
- List of North American tornadoes and tornado outbreaks
  - List of confirmed satellite tornadoes
- List of F5, EF5, and IF5 tornadoes
- Tornado emergency
