= Kiowa County Memorial Hospital =

Hospital in Kansas, U.S.

Coordinates: 37.6056°N 99.3015°W

The Kiowa County Memorial Hospital is a general acute-care hospital located in Greensburg, Kansas. On May 4, 2007, the hospital was destroyed by an EF5 tornado; the rebuilt structure, located at a different address, achieved a LEED Platinum certification. The hospital became the first in the United States to operate using carbon neutral energy and the first to use captured rainwater to flush toilets.

== See also ==
- List of hospitals in Kansas
